= Tropical cyclone effects by region =

Tropical cyclone effects and impacts

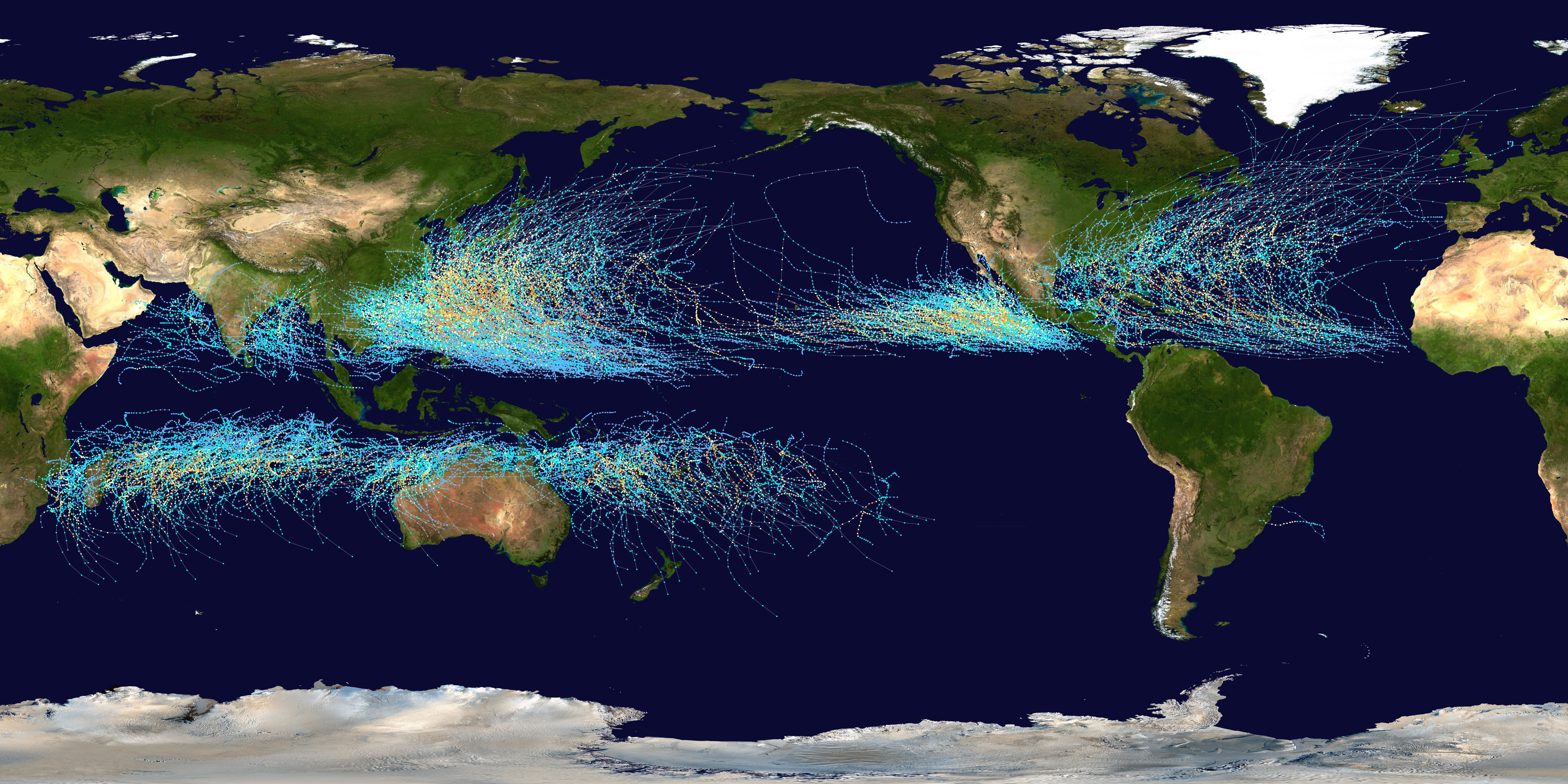
Global tropical cyclone tracks between 1985 and 2005, indicating the areas where tropical cyclones usually develop

Tropical cyclones regularly affect the coastlines of most of Earth's major bodies of water along the Atlantic, Pacific, and Indian oceans. Also known as hurricanes, typhoons, or other names, tropical cyclones have caused significant destruction and loss of human life, resulting in about 2 million deaths since the 19th century. Powerful cyclones that make landfall – moving from the ocean to over land – are some of the most impactful, although that is not always the case. An average of 86 tropical cyclones of tropical storm intensity form annually worldwide, with 47 reaching hurricane/typhoon strength, and 20 becoming intense tropical cyclones, super typhoons, or major hurricanes (at least of Category 3 intensity).

In Africa, tropical cyclones can originate from tropical waves generated over the Sahara Desert, or otherwise strike the Horn of Africa and Southern Africa. Cyclone Idai in March 2019 hit central Mozambique, becoming the deadliest tropical cyclone on record in Africa, with 1,302 fatalities, and damage estimated at US$2.2 billion. (Note: All damage figures are unadjusted for inflation.) Réunion island, located east of Southern Africa, experiences some of the wettest tropical cyclones on record. In January 1980, Cyclone Hyacinthe produced 6,083 mm (239.5 in) of rain over 15 days, which was the largest rain total recorded from a tropical cyclone on record. In Asia, tropical cyclones from the Indian and Pacific oceans regularly affect some of the most populated countries on Earth. In 1970, a cyclone struck Bangladesh, then known as East Pakistan, producing a 6.1 m (20 ft) storm surge that killed at least 300,000 people; this made it the deadliest tropical cyclone on record. In October 2019, Typhoon Hagibis struck the Japanese island of Honshu and inflicted US$15 billion in damage, making it the costliest storm on record in Japan. The islands that comprise Oceania, from Australia to French Polynesia, are routinely affected by tropical cyclones. In Indonesia, a cyclone struck the island of Flores in April 1973, killing 1,653 people, making it the deadliest tropical cyclone recorded in the Southern Hemisphere.

Atlantic and Pacific hurricanes regularly affect North America. In the United States, hurricanes Katrina in 2005 and Harvey in 2017 are the country's costliest ever natural disasters, with monetary damage estimated at US$125 billion. Katrina struck Louisiana and destroyed much of the city of New Orleans, while Harvey caused significant flooding in southeastern Texas after it dropped 60.58 in (1,539 mm) of rainfall; this was the highest rainfall total on record in the country. Europe is rarely affected by tropical cyclones; however, the continent regularly encounters storms after they transitioned into extratropical cyclones. Only one tropical depression – Vince in 2005 – struck Spain, and only one subtropical cyclone – Subtropical Storm Alpha in 2020 – struck Portugal. Occasionally, there are tropical-like cyclones in the Mediterranean Sea. The northern portion of South America experiences occasional tropical cyclones, with 173 fatalities from Tropical Storm Bret in August 1993. The South Atlantic Ocean is generally inhospitable to the formation of a tropical storm. However, in March 2004, Hurricane Catarina struck southeastern Brazil as the first hurricane on record in the South Atlantic Ocean.

== Background ==
Traditionally, tropical cyclones form in seven basins. These include the north Atlantic Ocean, the eastern and western parts of the northern Pacific Ocean, the southwestern Pacific, the southwestern and southeastern Indian Oceans, and the northern Indian Ocean (Arabian Sea and Bay of Bengal). The western Pacific is the most active and the north Indian the least active. An average of 86 tropical cyclones of tropical storm intensity form annually worldwide, with 47 reaching hurricane/typhoon strength, and 20 becoming intense tropical cyclones, super typhoons, or major hurricanes (at least of Category 3 intensity). Scientists initially believed that there were no South Atlantic tropical cyclones, an assertion proved false in 2004 when Cyclone Catarina struck southeastern Brazil. Occasionally, there are tropical-like cyclones in the Mediterranean Sea.

Since the 19th century, tropical cyclones have killed about 2 million people worldwide.

== Effects by area ==
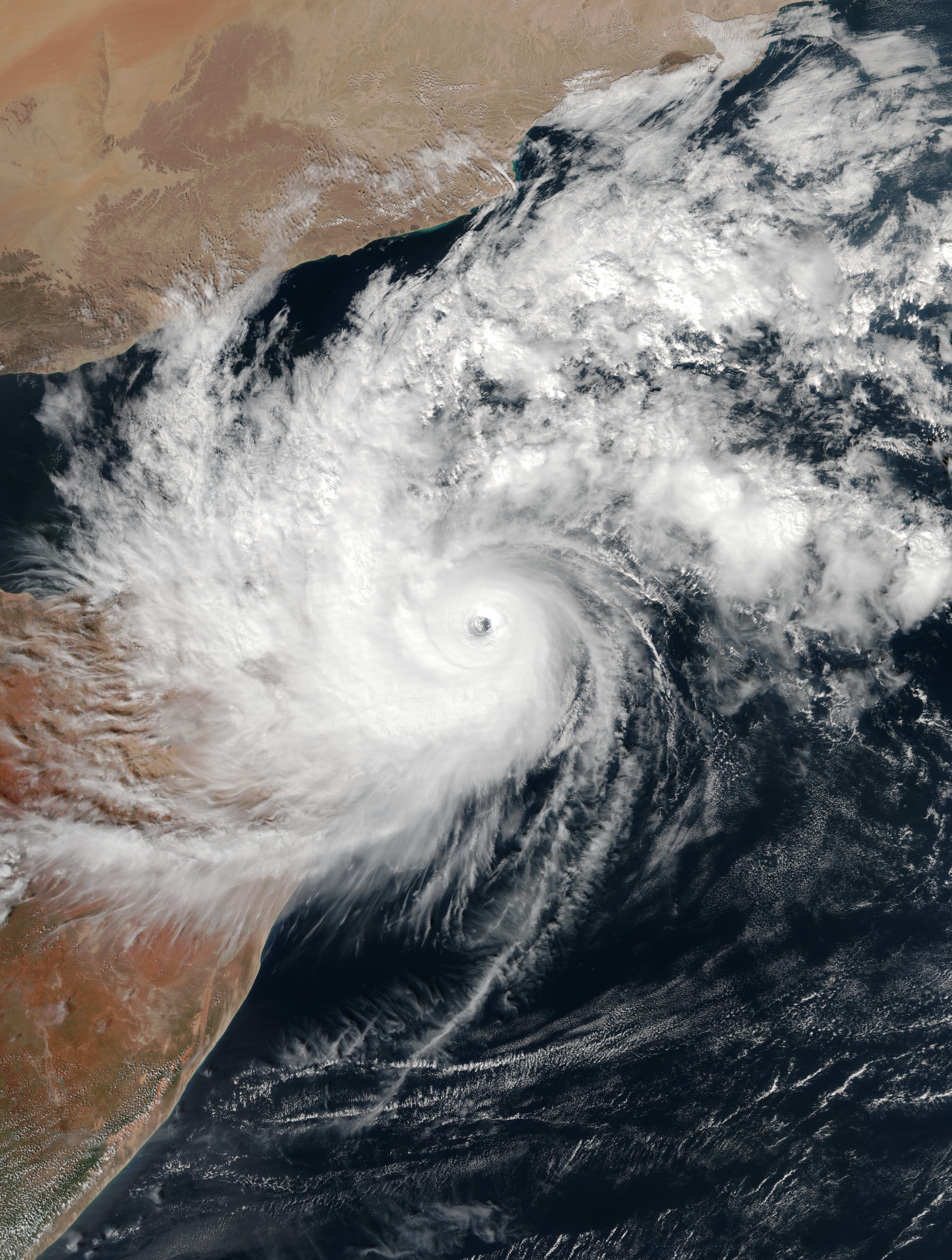
Cyclone Gati shortly after peak intensity before making landfall on Somalia

=== Africa ===
==== Indian Ocean ====
===== Horn of Africa =====
The Horn of Africa is a peninsula in eastern Africa that is bordered by the Indian Ocean to the south and east, as well as the Gulf of Aden and Red Sea to its northeast. The region includes Djibouti, Eritrea, Ethiopia, and Somalia.

In November 2013, a deep depression struck Somalia and killed 162 people while also causing extensive livestock damage. In 2018, Cyclone Sagar traversed the Gulf of Aden and made landfall on Lughaya in northwestern Somaliland with winds of 75 km/h (47 mph). Sagar killed 53 in Somalia, 2 in Djibouti, and 23 in eastern Ethiopia. In 2020, Cyclone Gati became the strongest landfalling cyclone in the Horn of Africa on record, making landfall in Somalia near Hafun with winds of 170 km/h (110 mph). Gati killed at least 9 people in Somalia.

===== Southern Africa =====
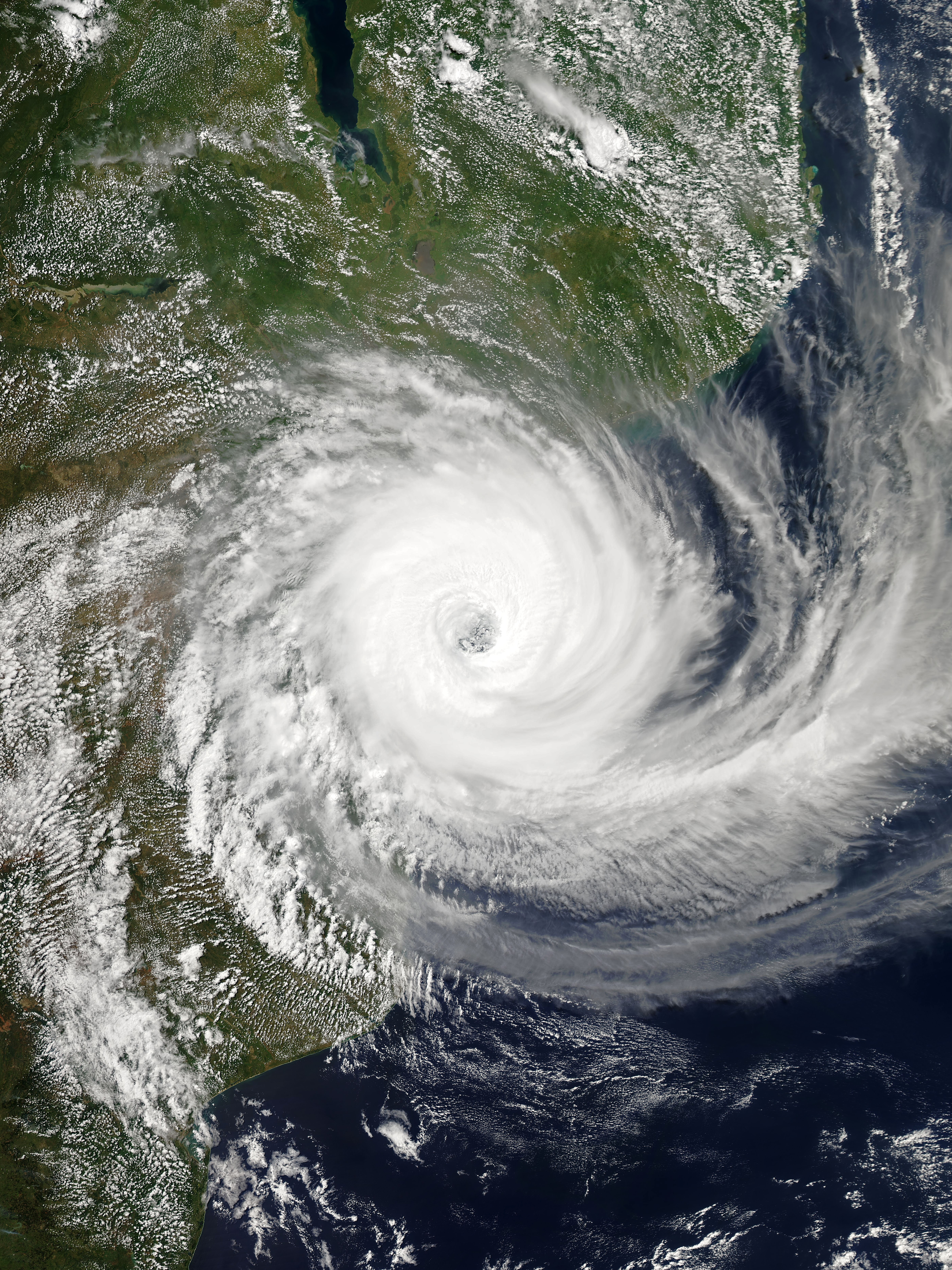
Satellite image of Cyclone Idai, one of the worst tropical cyclones on record in Africa

About 5% of cyclones in the south-west Indian Ocean make landfall along the east coast of Southern Africa, mostly affecting Mozambique, Tanzania, and South Africa.

In April 1952, a cyclone moved ashore southeastern Tanzania near Lindi with maximum sustained winds estimated at 180 km/h (110 mph); this made the cyclone the strongest on record to strike the country. The cyclone left 34 fatalities in Tanzania. In January 1984, Tropical Storm Domoina struck southern Mozambique and later crossed into eastern South Africa. The storm killed 109 people in Mozambique, 73 people in Eswatini, and 60 people in South Africa.

2000 was the first year on record in which two tropical cyclones of hurricane intensity struck Mozambique. In February 2000, Cyclone Eline hit central Mozambique after weeks of flooding, and their combined effects killed around 700 people and caused an estimated $500 million (USD) in damage. Eline also killed 12 people in Zimbabwe and 21 people in South Africa. The storm was followed weeks later by Cyclone Hudah, which killed three people in Mozambique. The only other year to feature tropical cyclone landfalls in the country was 2019. In March 2019, Cyclone Idai hit central Mozambique, becoming the second-deadliest tropical cyclone in the Southern Hemisphere, and the deadliest on record in Africa. Across southern Africa, Idai killed 1,302 people – and affected more than 3 million others. Total damages from Idai across Mozambique, Zimbabwe, Madagascar, and Malawi were estimated to be at least $2.2 billion (2019 USD). About a month later, Cyclone Kenneth became the strongest tropical cyclone on record to strike Mozambique, when it moved ashore just north of Pemba. The JTWC estimated landfall winds of 220 km/h (140 mph). Kenneth killed 45 people in Mozambique, less than two months after Idai's deadly trek through the region.

===== Comoros and Mayotte =====
The archipelago of the Comoros and the French overseas territory of Mayotte are located in the southern Indian Ocean in the Mozambique Channel. Due to their low latitude, the islands are rarely affected by tropical cyclones. In January 1983, Cyclone Elinah moved through the Comoros with winds of at least 136 km/h (85 mph). High waves killed 33 people and left US$23.1 million in damage. In April 2019, Cyclone Kenneth produced wind gusts of around 200 km/h (120 mph), along with 10 m (33 ft) waves. Kenneth killed nine people and destroyed 4,482 homes, while damaging another 7,013. Damage was estimated at CF81.7 billion (US$188 million), equivalent to 16% of the country's GDP.

In April 1984, Cyclone Kamisy passed about 50 km (31 mi) south of Mayotte, producing wind gusts of 148 km/h (92 mph). Kamisy killed one person, cut power for 48 hours, and destroyed the island's crops, with damage estimated at €25 million. In December 2024, Cyclone Chido destroyed much of Mayotte and caused moderate damage in Comoros.

===== Mascarene Islands =====
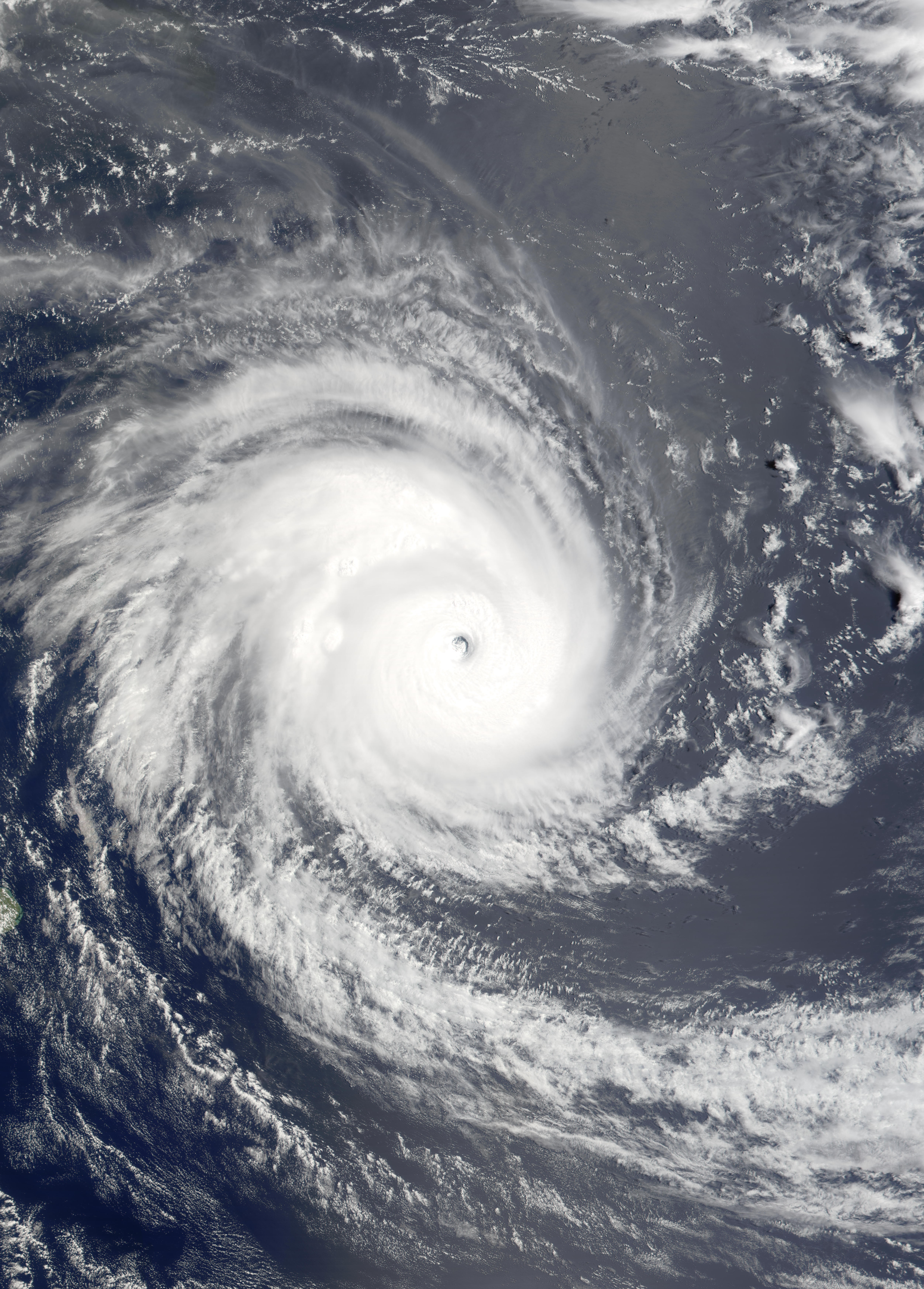
Cyclone Dina at peak intensity, one of the most damaging cyclones on record in the Mascarene Islands

The Mascarene Islands consist of Mauritius, the Mauritian island of Rodrigues, and the French overseas territory of Réunion, along with other smaller islands in the region.

In April 1892, a late-season cyclone impacted Mauritius, leaving 1,200 fatalities and causing $9.75 million (1892 USD, $277 million 2020 USD) in damage; this was the deadliest cyclone to affect the region in recorded history. In February 1975, Cyclone Gervaise made landfall on Mauritius, producing the highest wind gust recorded on the island of 280 km/h (170 mph) at Mon Desert. Damage was estimated at US$200 million, and 10 people died as a result of the storm. In 1994, Cyclone Hollanda passed near Mauritius, leaving US$135 million in damage. Severe Tropical Storm Monique passed just northwest of Rodrigues in 1968, producing a pressure of 933 millibars (27.55 inHg) on the island. Combined with a previous tropical cyclone that affected the island earlier that year, Cyclone Carmen, the storms caused at least US$5 million in damage.

The costliest tropical cyclone on record in Réunion was Cyclone Dina, which caused $190 million (2002 USD) in damage on the island, in addition to $97 million in Mauritius. Dina also produced the highest wind gust recorded on Réunion, at 277 km/h (172 mph). The storm indirectly killed 10 people; 6 in Réunion and 4 in Mauritius. In January 1948, a tropical cyclone struck Réunion, causing 165 deaths; this is the deadliest tropical cyclone on record on the island.

Some of the wettest tropical cyclones on record have impacted Réunion, including the wettest tropical cyclone of all time, Cyclone Hyacinthe. In January 1980, Hyacinthe took an erratic track near the island, resulting in torrential rain falling across almost all of the island; nearly the entire island received over 1 m (3.3 ft) of rain. At Commerson Crater, Hyacinthe dropped 6,083 mm (239.5 in) of rain, the largest rain total recorded from a tropical cyclone on record. Overall, Hyacinthe caused $167 million (1980 USD) in damage, and killed 25 people. Other record-breaking rainfall events caused by tropical cyclones in Réunion include Cyclone Denise, which dropped 1,144 mm (45.0 in) of rain in 12 hours and 1,825 mm (71.9 in) in 24 hours at Foc Foc; an unnamed tropical cyclone in 1958 caused 2,467 mm (97.1 in) of rain to fall at Aurere; and Cyclone Gamede dropped 3,929 mm (154.7 in) of rain at Commerson Crater. Gamede caused an estimated $120 million (2007 USD) in damage in Réunion, and killed 4 people overall in the Mascarene Islands.

===== Madagascar =====
On average, 1.5 tropical cyclones strike Madagascar each year, which is the most affected area in Africa. Each year, tropical cyclones cause an average of U$87 million in damage, resulting in $20 million in emergency costs. Most of the island is susceptible to flooding from tropical cyclones, with the northern portion of the country most likely to experience a significant storm surge. Toamasina, located in east-central Madagascar, is the most likely area to experience tropical cyclone damage.

In March 1927, a tropical cyclone struck eastern Madagascar, killing at least 500 people. On 7 March 2004, Cyclone Gafilo made landfall in northeastern Madagascar just south of Antalaha as a very intense tropical cyclone, making it one of the strongest cyclones on record to hit the country. Gafilo killed 363 people in the country and left $250 million in damage (2004 USD). Nationwide, Gafilo destroyed over 20,000 homes, leaving 304,000 people homeless, more than half near Antalaha. The ferry Sansom, sailing from Comoros to Mahajanga in northwestern Madagascar, capsized amid high waves, killing 117 of the 120 people on board.

===== Seychelles =====
Due to its proximity to the equator, the Seychelles is rarely affected by tropical cyclones. In December 2006, Cyclone Bondo passed through the Farquhar Group of islands, producing damaging high winds and waves.

==== Northern Africa ====
On occasion, cyclones in the Mediterranean can affect northern Africa, and which also have characteristics of a tropical cyclone. In September 2023, Storm Daniel moved ashore Libya and produced heavy rainfall, producing flash flooding after two dams failed. The storm killed at least 4,333 people in the country, becoming the deadliest storm to hit Africa in recorded history. In September 1969, a cyclone in the Mediterranean Sea killed nearly 600 people in Tunisia and Libya.

==== West Africa ====
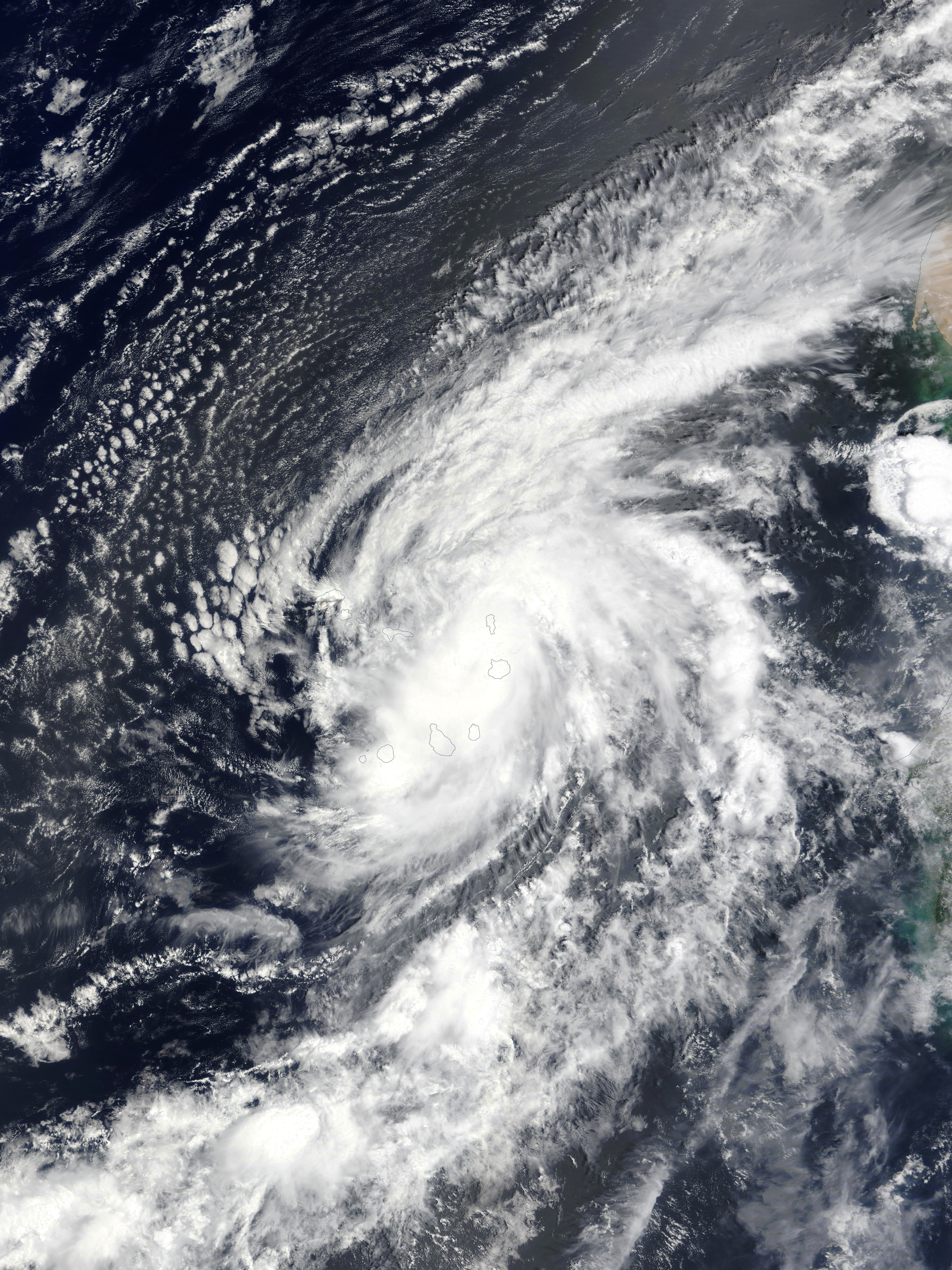
Hurricane Fred over Cape Verde at hurricane strength

The temperature contrast between the hot Sahara Desert in northern Africa and the cooler Gulf of Guinea to the south produces the African easterly jet, which generates tropical waves, or an elongated area of low pressure. These waves are often the formation source of Atlantic and Pacific hurricanes. Occasionally, tropical cyclones develop from tropical waves near or along the coastline of western Africa. In 1973, Tropical Storm Christine developed over the country of Guinea. In August 2015, Hurricane Fred formed just off the coast of Guinea, and it soon became the easternmost hurricane in the tropical Atlantic. Swells from the hurricane produced violent seas along the West African shoreline, destroying fishing villages and submerging swaths of residential areas in Senegal. Fred was the first hurricane to move through Cape Verde since 1892. Other deadly storms in Cape Verde include Tropical Storm Beryl in 1982 which killed three people, Tropical Storm Fran in 1984, which killed at least 29 people, and Hurricane Debbie in 1961, which caused a plane crash that killed 60 people. Although Western Africa is rarely affected directly by tropical cyclones, the extratropical remnants of Tropical Storm Delta in 2005 struck Morocco. Tropical cyclones in the South Atlantic Ocean are unusual; however, a possible tropical storm formed west of Angola in April 1991.

=== Asia ===
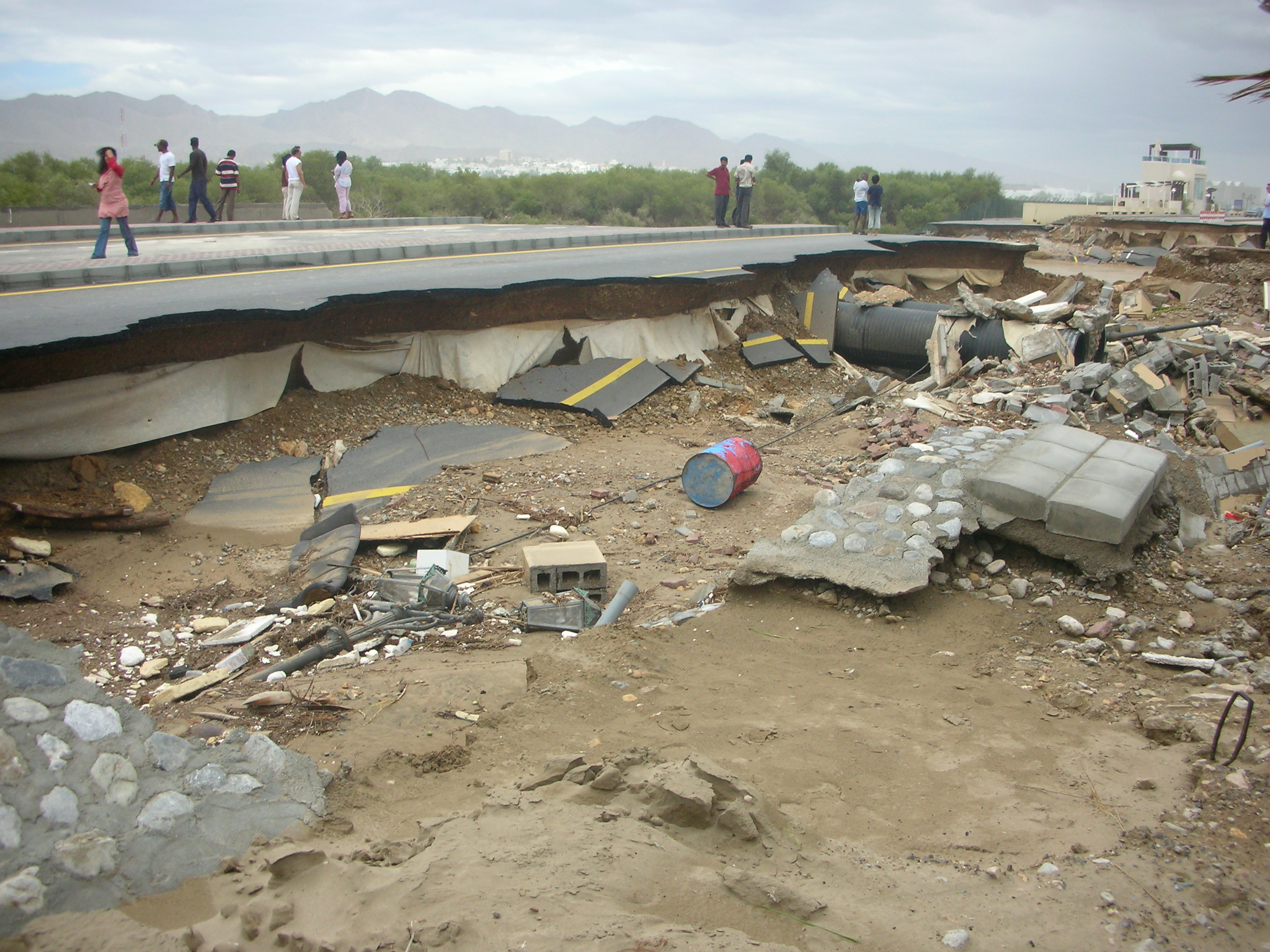
Road damage in Muscat, Oman from Cyclone Gonu, the strongest recorded tropical cyclone to strike the Arabian Peninsula

==== Indian Ocean ====
===== Arabian Peninsula =====
The Arabian Peninsula is a peninsula between the Red Sea, the Arabian Sea, and the Persian Gulf. Although tropical cyclones often form in the southeastern Arabian Sea, most storms tend to dissipate before reaching the Arabian Peninsula due to cooler waters or dry air from the Arabian desert. Despite that, there have been occasionally intense tropical cyclones to affect the peninsula. Cyclone Gonu in June 2007 made landfall in extreme eastern Oman near Ras al Hadd with winds of 150 km/h (93 mph). Gonu killed 50 people and caused US$4.2 billion in damage in Oman, making it the worst natural disaster on record in the country. In June 1977, a cyclone struck eastern Oman and killed at least 105 people; it was considered Oman's worst natural disaster of the 20th century.

In 1996, a tropical storm that struck Oman produced the worst flooding in record in neighboring Yemen, as well as the heaviest rainfall in 70 years. The floods killed 338 people, and damaged structures built 2,000 years by the Roman Empire. In November 2015, Cyclone Chapala became the first recorded storm to make landfall in Yemen as a very severe cyclonic storm – the equivalent of a hurricane – when it struck Ar Riyan with winds of 120 km/h (75 mph). Just days later, Cyclone Megh followed a similar path and struck southeastern Yemen. Collectively, Megh and Chapala killed 26 people and injured 78 in Yemen.

===== Bangladesh =====
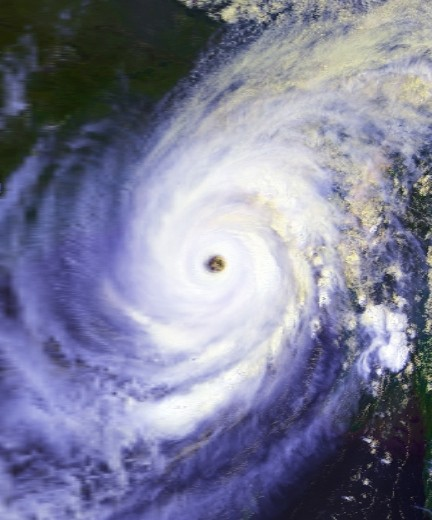
Satellite image of the 1991 Bangladesh cyclone

Located in the northeastern extent of the Bay of Bengal, Bangladesh is highly populated and near sea-level, which makes the country vulnerable to storm surge flooding from landfalling tropical cyclones. From 1950 to 2001, an average 1.26 tropical cyclones struck Bangladesh each year, most commonly in May and October. About once every five years, a severe tropical cyclone affected the country.

Bangladesh has a history of deadly tropical cyclones. A cyclone in 1876 killed at least 100,000 people, and another cyclone in 1897 killed 175,000 people. On 12 November 1970, a cyclone struck Bangladesh, then known as East Pakistan, producing a 6.1 m (20 ft) storm surge that killed at least 300,000 people. This made it the deadliest tropical cyclone on record. The cyclone wrecked about 400,000 houses, 99,000 boats, and 3,500 schools. The local government's lack of response to the storm was a partial factor in the Bangladesh Liberation War, one of the first instances in which a natural disaster led to a civil war. After the storm, Bangladesh instituted a Cyclone Preparedness Programme to better inform residents of approaching storms, construct more shelters, and restore coastal mangrove forests to mitigate storm surge flooding. Another powerful cyclone struck the country in 1991, killing 138,000 people and displacing around 10 million people homeless, with more than 1 million homes destroyed. In 2007, a similarly strong Cyclone Sidr struck the country, killing 3,406 people. The reduced death toll, compared to the 1970 and 1991 storm, was partially due to the improved warning systems and more shelters.

===== India =====
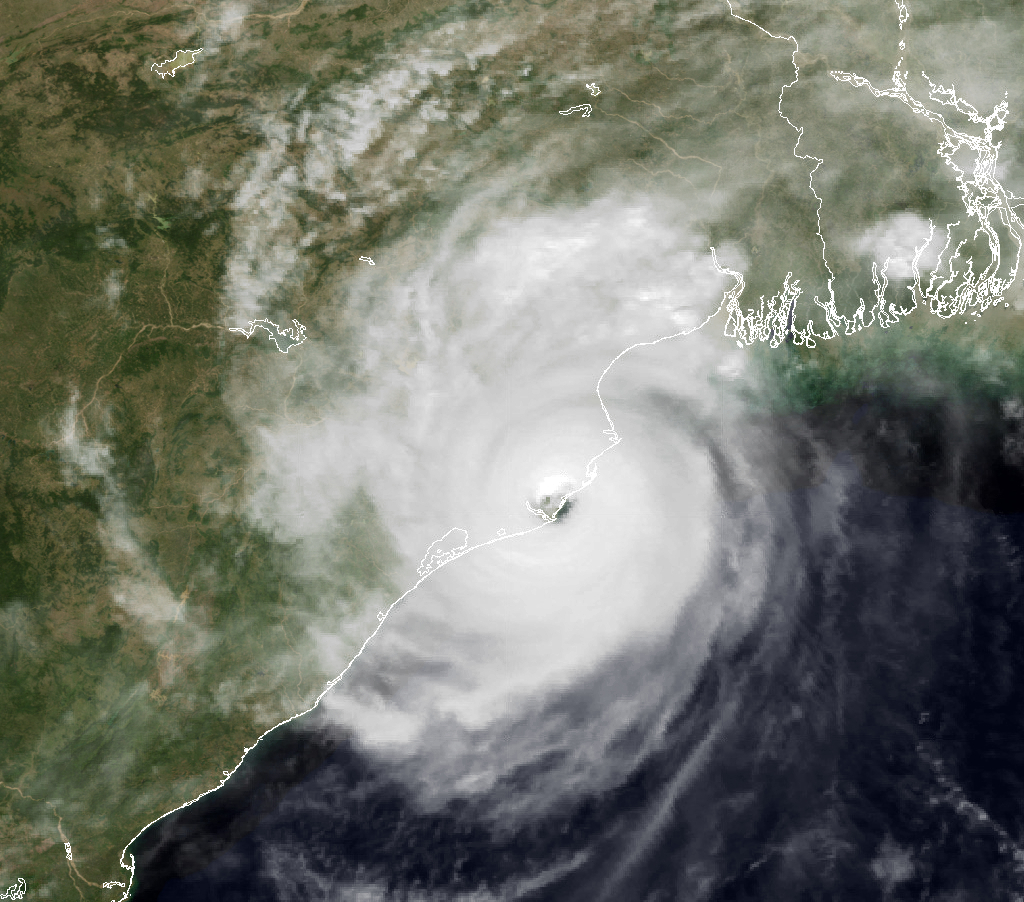
Satellite image of the 1999 super cyclone that struck Odisha

The India Meteorological Department issues warnings for all tropical cyclones in the northern Indian Ocean. Tropical cyclones more typically affect India from the Bay of Bengal on its east coast than the Arabian Sea on its west coast. The east Indian state of Odisha has historically been the most affected throughout the country, while the most landfalls by severe cyclonic storms occurred in Andhra Pradesh. On India's west coast, the most commonly affected state was Gujarat. From 1891 to 2000, there was an average of 3.2 tropical cyclone landfalls in the country's, most of which were on the east coast along the Bay of Bengal.

The strongest cyclone on record in the Bay of Bengal was a super cyclonic storm in 1999, which made landfall on Paradeep, Odisha, in October 1999, with winds of 260 km/h (160 mph). The cyclone killed 9,887 people across Odisha, with 1.6 million houses damaged or destroyed. Damage was estimated at US$1.5 billion. The only other super cyclonic storm in India was a landfalling storm in Andhra Pradesh in 1977, which killed at least 10,000 people and left ₹1.7 billion (US$196 million) in damage. Other deadly Indian cyclones include cyclones in 1833 and 1864, both of which killed about 50,000 people. In May 2020, Cyclone Amphan moved ashore in West Bengal, inflicting at least 1 trillion (US$13.2 billion) in damage; this made Amphan India's costliest cyclone on record.

===== Inland countries =====
Afghanistan is a mountainous country north of Pakistan. In June 2007, the remnants of Cyclone Yemyin caused damaging floods in the country that killed at least 56 people.

The remnants of a cyclone hitting eastern India also produced heavy rainfall and snowfall in the mountains of Nepal, killing 63 people. The snow caught mountain trekking teams off-guard, and 24 hikers were killed by an avalanche near Gokyo, which made it Nepal's deadliest avalanche in Nepal to affect a hiking expedition. On 12 October 2014, Cyclone Hudhud struck southeastern India and maintained its identity as a low pressure area as it moved through the country into the Himalayas. Hudhud interacted with an approaching trough from the west. The orographic lift of the mountains led to heavy rainfall, estimated at more than 160 mm (6.3 in), while also producing blizzard conditions in some areas. Avalanches killed 43 people, including 21 trekkers climbing Mount Annapurna.

On 20 May 2020, Cyclone Amphan moved ashore near the border of India and Bangladesh, and continued moving northeastward while weakening. Heavy rainfall in Bhutan caused landslides, flooding, and power outages.

===== Iran =====
In June 2007, Cyclone Gonu moved ashore southern Iran after affecting the Arabian Peninsula. It was the first storm to strike the country since 1898. Gonu killed 23 people and left US$216 million in damage.

===== Maldives =====
On 31 October 2012, Cyclone Nilam moved ashore southern India. Heavy rainfall extended far from the circulation, resulting in flooding in the Maldives that left US$133,090 in damage.

===== Myanmar =====
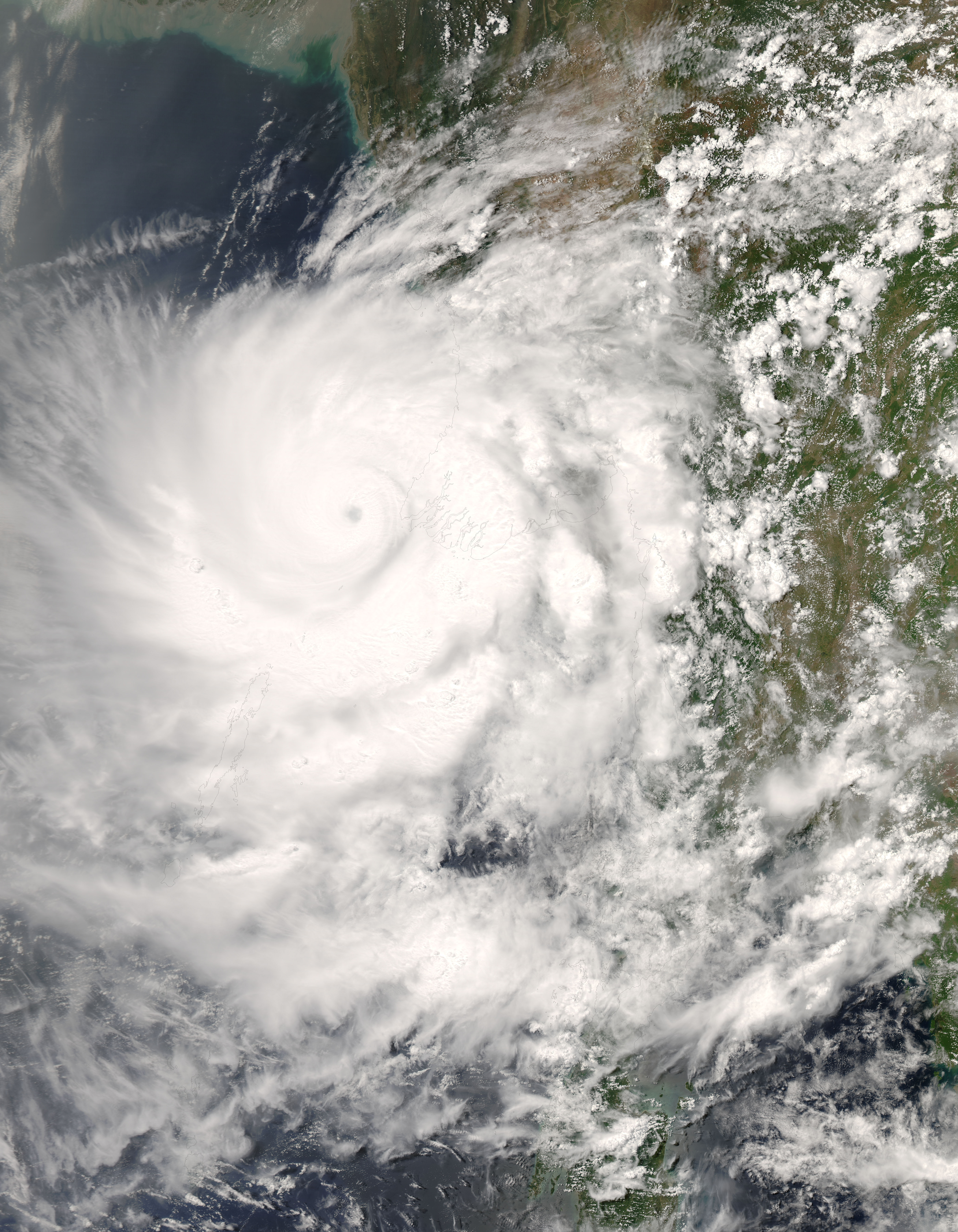
Cyclone Nargis shortly before landfall in the Ayeyarwady Region of Myanmar

In May 2008, Cyclone Nargis struck the low-lying Irrawaddy Delta of Myanmar with strong winds and a 3.7 m (12 ft) storm surge, killing an estimated 140,000 people, and becoming the country's worst natural disaster on record. This made Nargis among the deadliest tropical cyclones on record. Myanmar was largely unprepared for the cyclone, lacking shelters and an early warning system. Nargis damaged or destroyed more than 700,000 homes, leaving more than 1 million people homeless. Damage was estimated at over US$10 billion. In the ten years after the cyclone, Myanmar installed radar and observation stations while improving its early warning system.

===== Pakistan =====
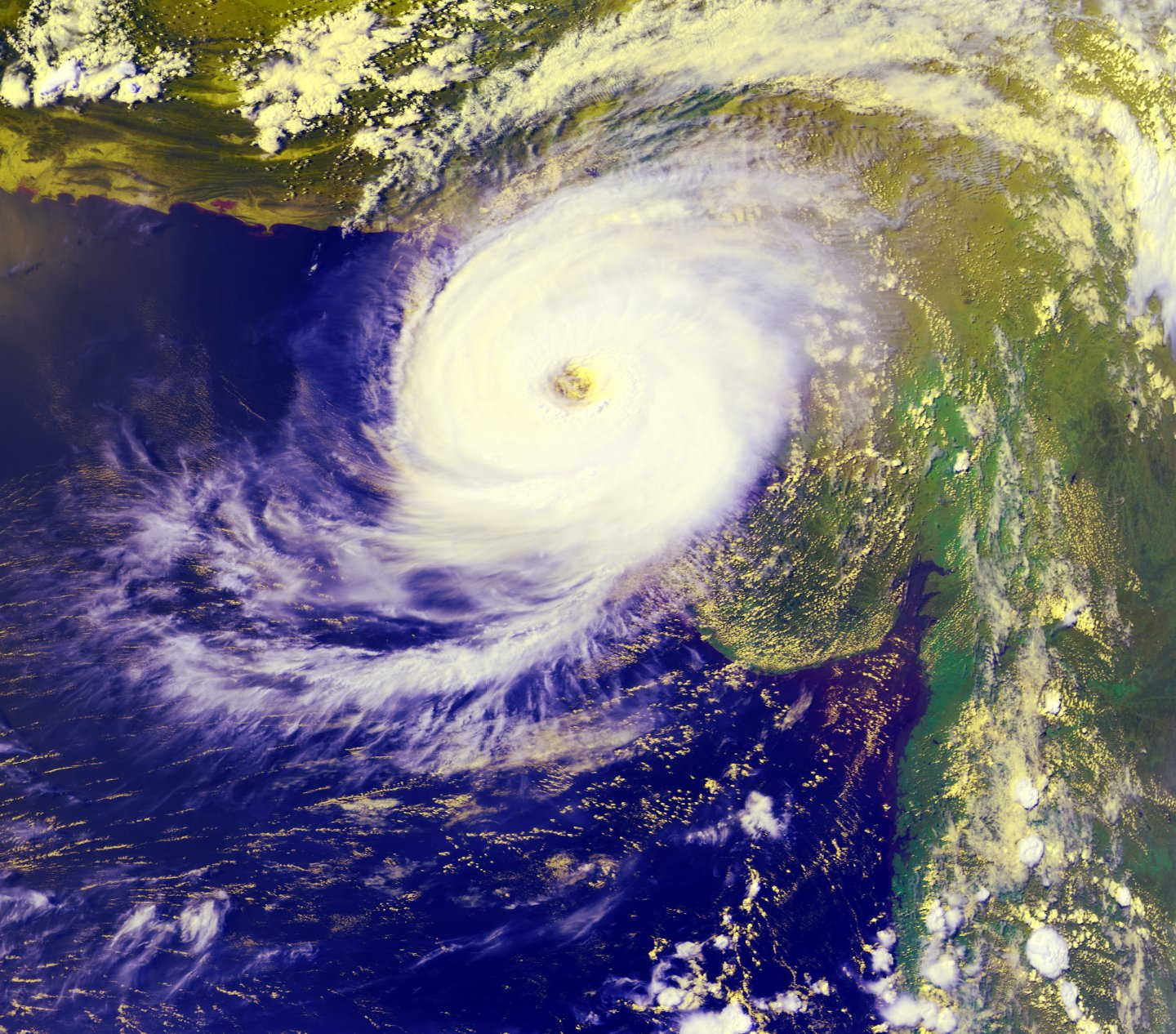
The 1999 Pakistan cyclone making landfall near Karachi in Pakistan

In December 1965, a cyclone hit Karachi, killing an estimated 10,000 people, making it Pakistan's deadliest tropical cyclone since 1950. It was one of only six cyclones to strike Pakistan from 1950 to 2012. In May 1999, Pakistan's strongest landfalling cyclone hit near Karachi, killing an estimated 6,200 people; many of them were swept out to sea. More than 75,000 houses were destroyed.

===== Sri Lanka =====
Tropical cyclones occasionally affect the island nation of Sri Lanka, especially the north and eastern portions of the island. Most of the landfalling cyclones occurred in November or December, during the island's Maha season. In December 1964, a cyclone produced a significant storm surge of 4.5 m (15 ft), with up to 2,000 people killed on the island. A powerful cyclone in 1978 killed more than 1,000 people in the country, with more than 250,000 houses damaged. In May 2003, a cyclonic storm stalled in the Bay of Bengal, and its plume of moisture produced the worst disaster on Sri Lanka in over 50 years. Flooding and landslides killed 260 people.

==== West Pacific ====
===== China =====
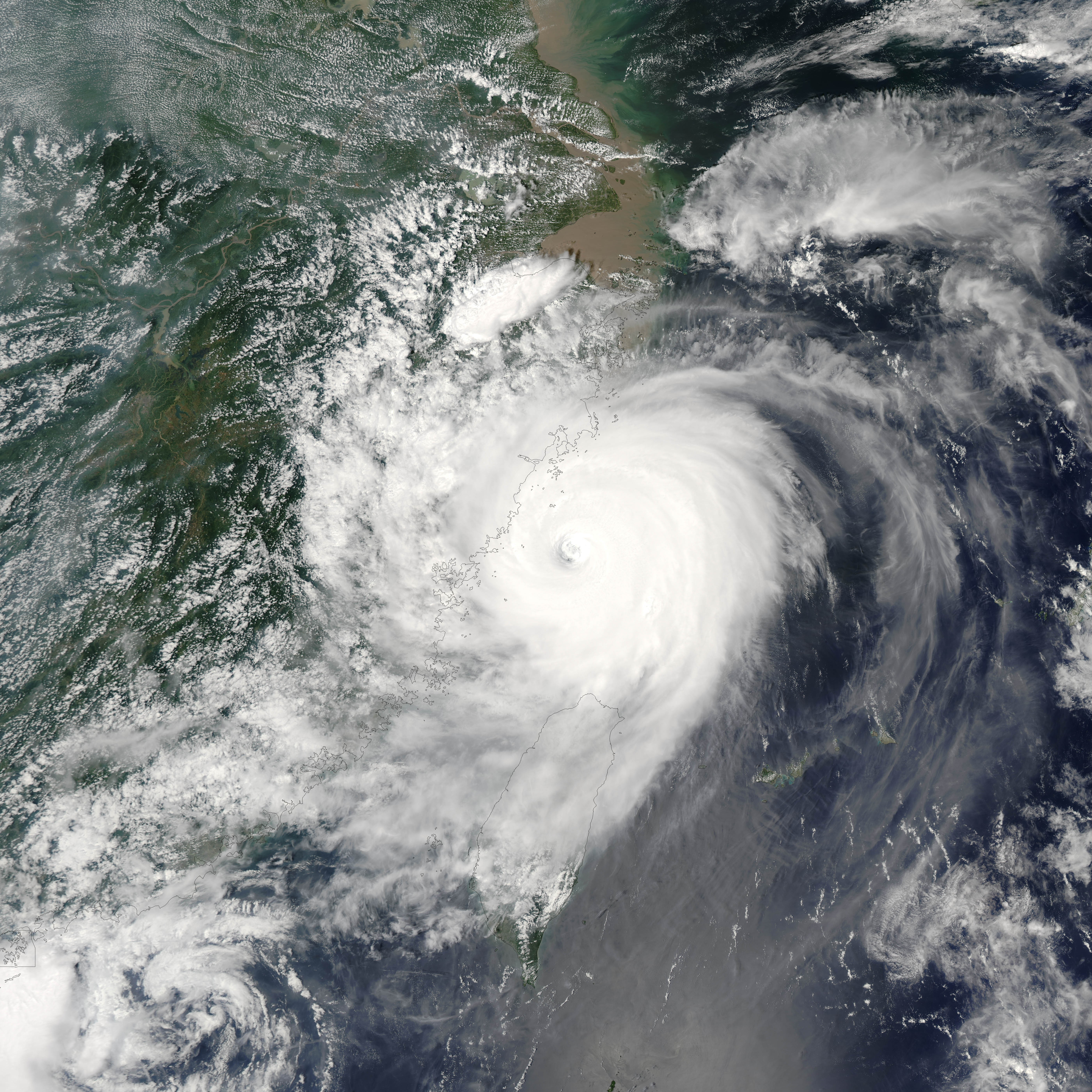
Satellite image of Typhoon Saomai nearing the Chinese province of Zhejiang

One of the oldest known typhoons to strike China was in November 975, when a typhoon struck Guangzhou. Each year on average, about ten tropical cyclones make landfall in China, and another two storms affect the coast without moving ashore. The most affected provinces are Hainan and Guangdong in southern China, along with Fujian and Zhejiang in southeastern China. Less commonly affected provinces are Jiangsu, Shanghai, and Shandong where the coastline curves to the northwest, and at which latitude most typhoons recurve to the northeast.

In late August 1931, a typhoon struck Shanghai following a series of storms making landfall in China. The typhoon contributed to China's worst recorded flooding, causing a break in the levee along Lake Gaoyou and the Grand Canal. The breaks flooded a 25,900 km^{2} (10,000 mi^{2}) portion of northern Jiangsu, including 80 towns, killing 300,000 people, according to contemporaneous news reports. In the city of Gaoyou, the levee break killed 2,000 people in the middle of the night. In August 1975, Typhoon Nina struck the Chinese province of Fujian and progressed into central China, dropping torrential rainfall totaling 1,605 mm (63.2 in) over three days in the province of Henan. The resulting floods caused 64 dams to fail, including the large Banqiao and Shimantan dams, which directly killed 26,000 people and indirectly killed another 100,000 people. Damage from the floods was estimated at US$6.7 billion, one of China's most destructive floods on record.

In August 2006, Typhoon Saomai became the strongest typhoon on record to strike China, with a central pressure of 920 mbar (27 inHg) and winds of 215 km/h (134 mph) at its landfall in Zhejiang. It produced wind gusts of 293 km/h (182 mph) in Wenzhou. The typhoon killed 456 people and left more than US$4.2 billion in damage. China's costliest typhoon on record was Typhoon Fitow in 2013, which inflicted ¥63.1 billion in damage (US$10.4 billion) when it struck Wenzhou as the most powerful October landfall in mainland China.

===== Korean Peninsula =====
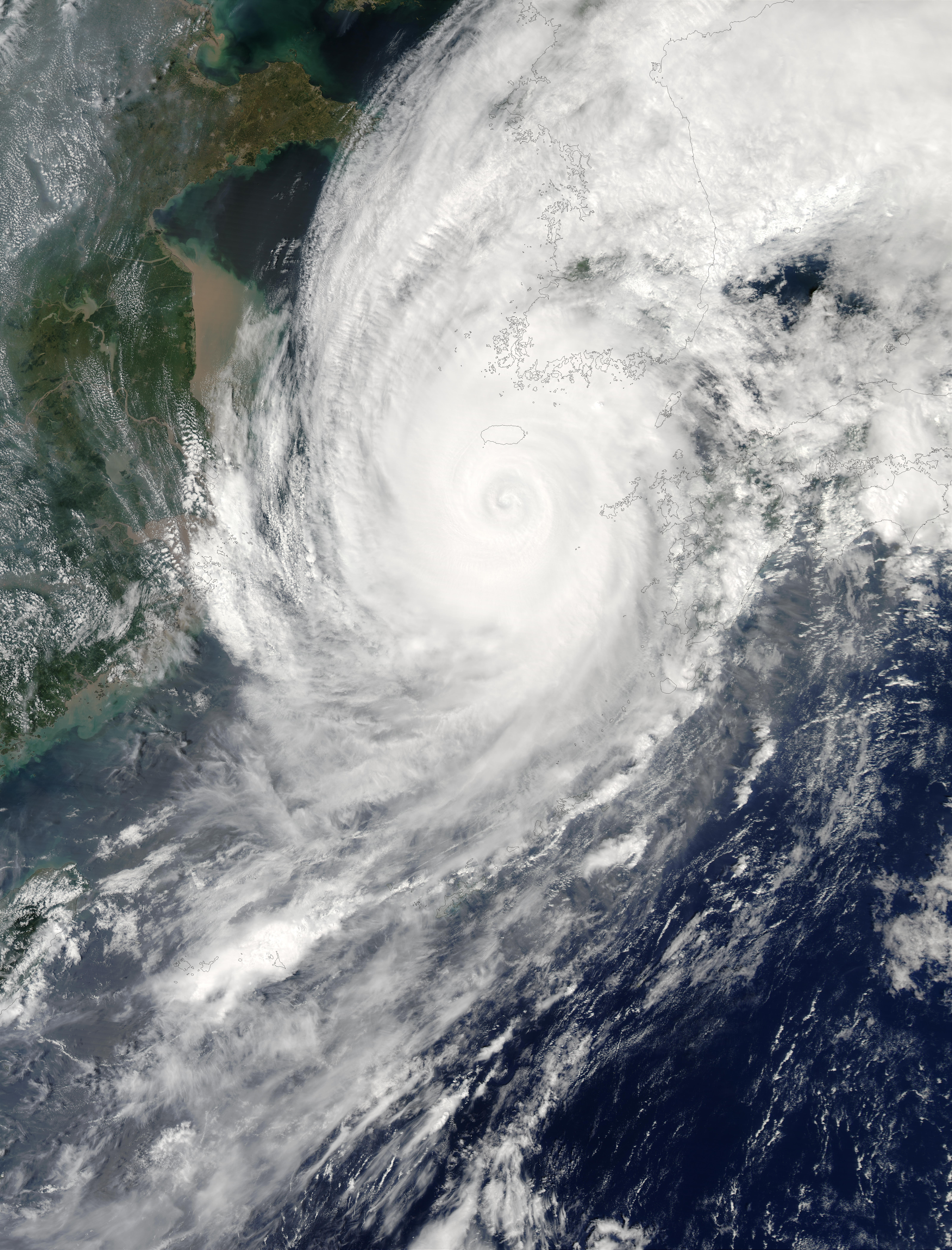
Satellite imagery of Typhoon Maemi nearing South Korea

In 1959, Typhoon Sarah made landfall just west of Busan, South Korea with sustained winds of 185 km/h (115 mph). It killed 849 people in the country, the deadliest storm on record in South Korea. The strongest typhoon on record to hit South Korea was Typhoon Maemi in 2003, which also moved ashore near Busan with winds of 190 km/h (120 mph). The costliest storm on record in the Korean peninsula was Typhoon Rusa in 2002, which inflicted US$6 billion in damage.

During 2020, 3 tropical cyclones made landfall on the Korean Peninsula in a span of 2 weeks. The first, Typhoon Bavi, made landfall in North Korea. Typhoon Maysak and Typhoon Haishen would follow, both making landfall in eastern South Korea. Haishen would go on to make landfall in North Korea, while Maysak would impact North Korea as well. Combined impacts between Maysak and Haishen in South Korea were calculated at ₩606.3 billion (US$510 million). The state television network of North Korea broadcast overnight during the passings of Bavi and Maysak.

===== Japan =====
An average of 2.6 typhoons strike Japan each year. In 2004, ten typhoons struck Japan, the greatest number in a single season, surpassing the previous record of six set in 1990. In September 1959, Typhoon Vera made landfall in Japan on Honshu with estimated sustained winds of 260 km/h (160 mph), killing about 5,000 people in the country; that made Vera the deadliest tropical cyclone on record in Japan. In October 2019, Typhoon Hagibis struck the island of Honshu and inflicted US$15 billion in damage, making it the costliest storm on record in Japan.

===== Philippines =====
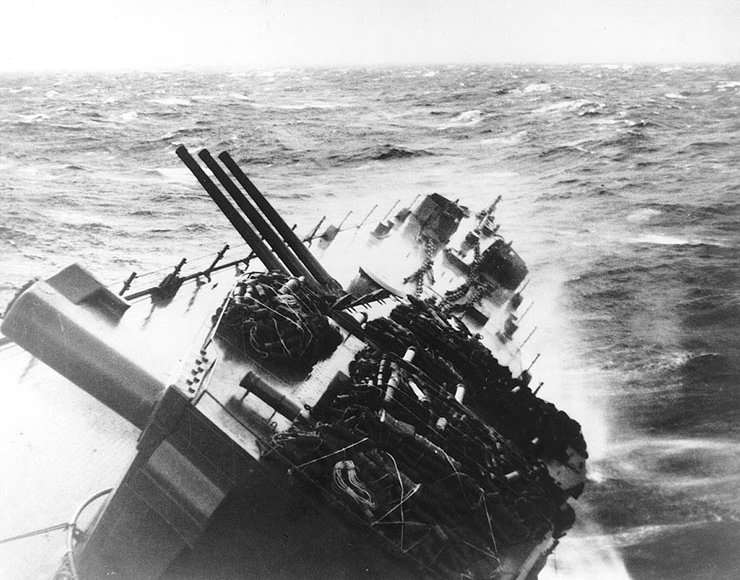
USS Santa Fe (CL-60) rolling heavily during Typhoon Cobra in December 1944

Each year, an average of nine tropical cyclones strike the Philippines, with most landfalls in the northern island of Luzon. The Philippines has the second most number of tropical cyclone landfalls in the world, after China, but more intense cyclones hit the Philippines compared to any other country.

In November 2013, Typhoon Haiyan made landfall in Eastern Samar and subsequently crossed the central Philippines; the storm, locally known as Yolanda, killed 6,300 people. Damage totaled ₱95.5 billion (US$2.2 billion).

===== Russia =====
In 1984, the remnants of Typhoon Holly affected the Russian Far East, then a part of the Soviet Union. The storm produced the worst flooding along the Amur River since 1928 after a dam burst. In 2020, Typhoon Maysak struck Primorsky Krai as an extratropical cyclone, which killed three people and led to ₽200 million (US$2.66 million) in losses.

===== Taiwan =====
Each year, three to four typhoons hit the island of Taiwan. In 2020, no storms struck the island, marking the first typhoon-free year in Taiwan in more than 50 years. In summer and fall, tropical cyclones typically produce 43.5% of the island's rainfall.

In August 1959, Typhoon Joan struck southeastern Taiwan with winds of 295 km/h (183 mph), according to the JTWC. In August 2009, Typhoon Morakot moved slowly across the island, dropping torrential rainfall reaching 2,855 mm (112.4 in), the highest amount for any Taiwan typhoon. The rains caused severe flooding and landslides, including one in Siaolin Village that killed around 500 people. Morakot killed 671 people on Taiwan, becoming the island's deadliest typhoon.

===== Thailand =====
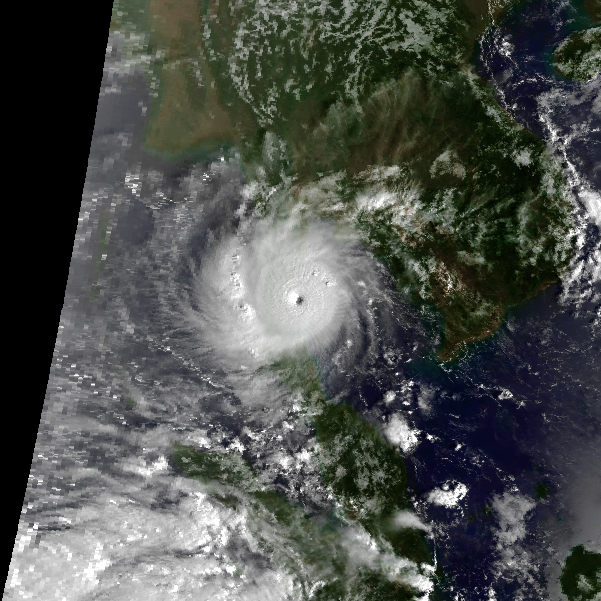
Typhoon Gay shortly before landfall in Thailand

Thailand is typically affected by 2.9 tropical cyclones per year, mostly as tropical depressions. In November 1989, Typhoon Gay became the first typhoon on record to make landfall in Thailand since 1891, damaging 38,000 houses and killing 602 people. Monetary losses reached 11 billion baht (US$456.5 million), ranking Gay as one of the costliest disasters in the country's history. The deadliest tropical cyclone in Thailand since 1950 was Tropical Storm Harriet in 1962, which killed 935 people.

===== Vietnam =====
Each year, 2.6 tropical cyclones strike Vietnam, typically along the central or northern coastline. Typhoons account for 80% of annual disaster-related damage in the country.

In October 1881, a typhoon struck what is now northern Vietnam, producing a storm surge that flooded the city of Haiphong, killing around 3,000 people. In October 1997, Tropical Storm Linda struck southern Vietnam, where it wrecked thousands of fishing boats and killed at least 3,111 people. In 2009, Typhoon Ketsana struck central Vietnam, causing an estimated 16.07 trillion VND (US$896.1 million) in damage. In 2020, a series of storms affected Vietnam, beginning with Tropical Storm Linfa, which dropped 90.16 inches (2,290 mm) of rainfall in A Lưới. The storm killed at least 114 people.

==== Indonesia ====
In April 1973, a cyclone in the Flores Sea struck the island of Flores; across the region, the storm killed 1,653 people, making it the deadliest tropical cyclone recorded in the Southern Hemisphere. In December 2001, Tropical Storm Vamei struck northeastern Sumatra after having moved from the South China Sea. In May 2013, Cyclone Viyaru in the Indian Ocean produced flooding in northwestern Sumatra, killing at least four people. In April 2021, Cyclone Seroja produced flooding and landslides across Indonesia, causing at least 181 deaths, and at least 3.4 trillion rupiah (US$235.7 million) in damage.

==== East Timor ====
In April 2021, Cyclone Seroja dropped torrential rainfall in the country, leading to 42 deaths. Damage was estimated at US$100 million.

=== Australia and Oceania ===
==== Australia ====
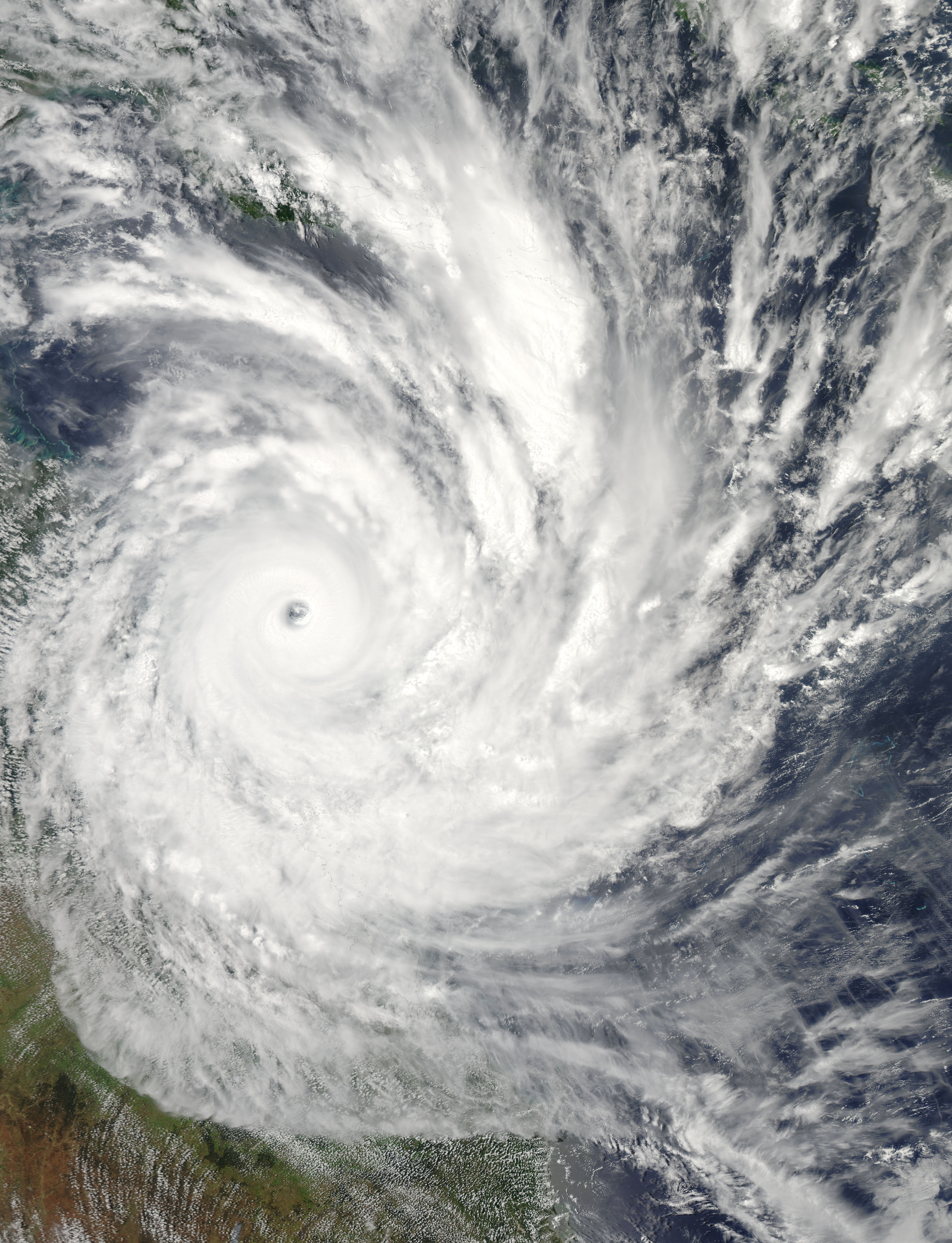
Satellite image of Cyclone Yasi nearing Queensland in northeastern Australia

Australia is a continent and island country in the southern hemisphere located in Oceania between the Indian Ocean and the South Pacific Ocean. On 1 January 1908, the Bureau of Meteorology began managing the country's weather recordkeeping. Annually, ten tropical cyclones develop in the waters around Australia, of which six make landfall in the country. From 1839 to 2005, tropical cyclones accounted for more than 2,100 deaths in Australia, mostly related to shipwrecks; this represented about 35% of deaths related to natural disasters.

Australia's deadliest tropical cyclone on record, and possibly most intense, was Cyclone Mahina, which made landfall on Bathurst Bay in the northeastern state of Queensland. A ship, the Crest of the Wave, recorded a minimum pressure of 880 mbar (26 inHg), making it a Category 5 on the Australian region tropical cyclone scale and one of the most intense tropical cyclones in the Southern Hemisphere. The intense cyclone produced the largest recorded storm surge worldwide, estimated at 13 m (43 ft), which washed more than 800 m (0.50 mi) inland. Mahina killed at least 307 people, most of them due to 54 shipwrecks.

According to Australia's Bureau of Meteorology, one of the country's most significant tropical cyclones was Cyclone Tracy in 1974, which killed 71 people in Northern Territory. Early on December 25 (local time), Cyclone Tracy struck the territory capital of Darwin, where it produced a wind gust of 217 km/h (135 mph) before the anemometer at the airport failed. The cyclone damaged or destroyed 80% of the buildings in the town, forcing 75% of the town's residents to evacuate, resulting in Australia's largest ever peacetime evacuation. The total cost of the storm damage and reconstruction was estimated at over $500 million (1974 AUD). Australia's costliest tropical cyclone was Cyclone Yasi, which struck Mission Beach, Queensland on 3 February 2011, as a Category 5 on the Australian region tropical cyclone scale. The cyclone left about US$2.8 billion in damage.

On average, two tropical cyclones make landfall in Western Australia each year, of which one is a severe tropical cyclone. The earliest landfall in a season was in 1910, when a tropical cyclone struck Broome on November 19. The latest landfall in a season was in 1988, when Cyclone Herbie struck Shark Bay on May 21. Early-season cyclones tend to affect the Kimberley and Pilbara in the northern part of the state, while late season storms tend to affect regions farther south. The highest wind gust recorded worldwide occurred during Cyclone Olivia in 1996. On April 10, the cyclone passed near Barrow Island before moving ashore Western Australia near Mardie. A station on the island recorded a wind gust of 408 kilometres per hour (254 mph), breaking the worldwide wind gust record of 372 km/h (231 mph), set on Mount Washington in the United States in April 1934.

==== Oceania ====
===== Cook Islands =====
The Cook Islands in the South Pacific Ocean are affected by about 1.8 tropical cyclones each year, mostly during El Niño events. Cyclones are the islands' most frequent form of natural disaster. In 1997, Cyclone Martin killed 19 people in the archipelago, making it the deadliest storm there on record. In 2005, five tropical cyclones affected the Cook Islands in the span of six weeks.

===== Federated States of Micronesia =====
Tropical cyclones can affect the Federated States of Micronesia any time of year. Storms cause about US$8 million in damage or losses each year, equivalent to 2.8% of the country's GDP. The nation's costliest storm on record was Typhoon Mitag in 2002, which left US$150 million in damage or losses, along with one fatality. Later that year, Typhoon Chataan moved through the archipelago in its formative stages, dropping torrential rainfall, with a 24-hour total 506 mm (19.9 in) on Weno Island. The rains caused flooding and landslides, killing 47 people.

===== Fiji =====
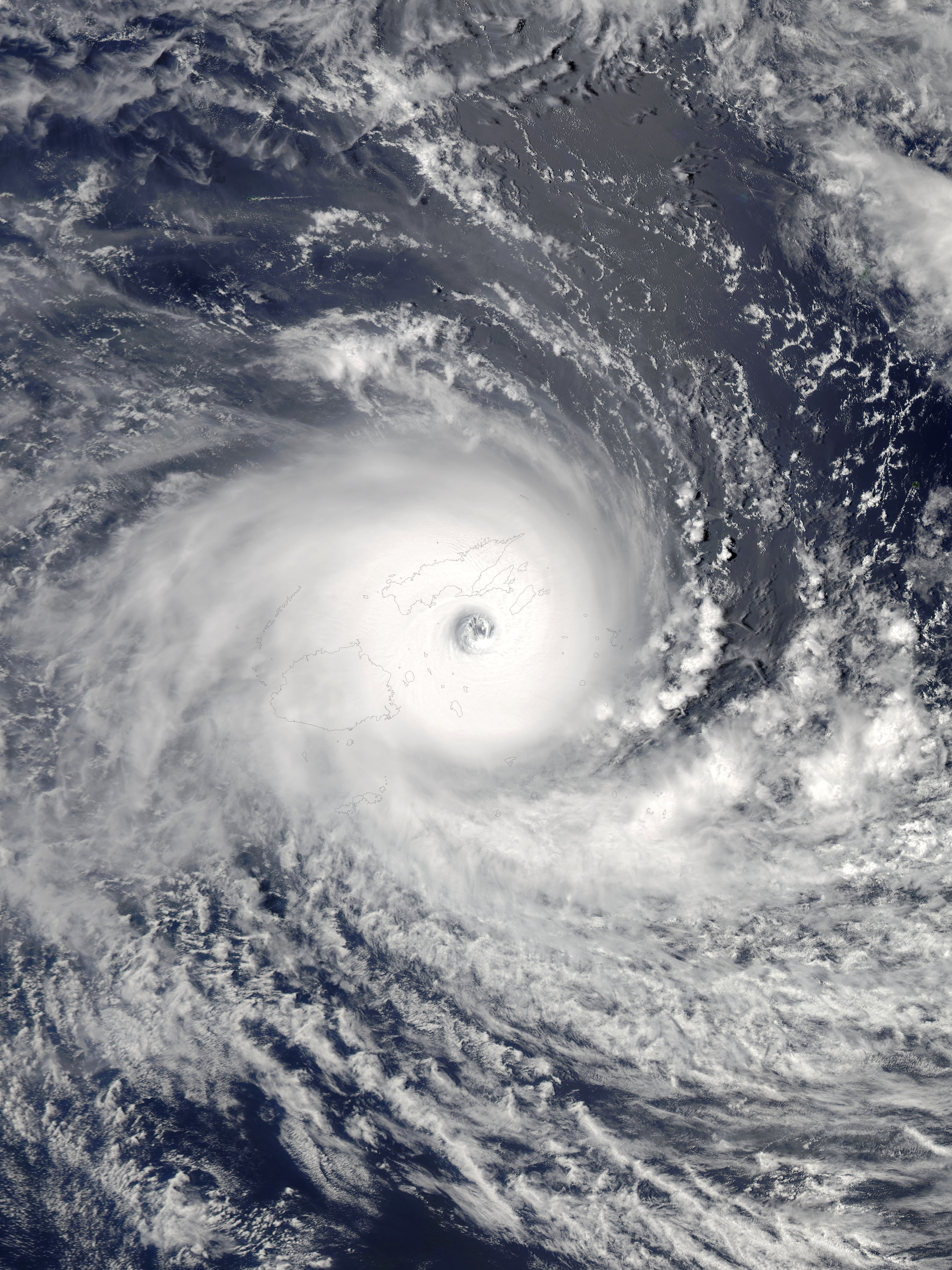
Winston at record peak intensity just before landfall in Fiji in February 2016

Tropical cyclones are the most serious natural hazard that Fiji experiences in terms of total damage and economic loss, with the island nation directly impacted by an average of 10 - 12 tropical cyclones during a decade or at least 1 - 2 tropical cyclones each season. They generally impact the country during the cyclone season between November and the following April, however, systems have impacted the island nation outside of these times. However, there have been at least 14 seasons where no direct impacts to Fiji have been recorded, while five named systems impacted the island nation during the 1992-93 season. The effects of tropical cyclones on Fiji are most significant at the coast, however, as Fiji is a small country, the whole island nation can be severely impacted by widespread flooding, landslides and storm-force winds. The frequency and intensity of tropical cyclones impacting Fiji is one of the major barriers, to the island nations economic growth and development. The average annual losses to assets from tropical cyclones amount to about FJ$152 million or about 1.6% of the island nations gross domestic product.

The worst tropical cyclone on record to impact Fiji was Severe Tropical Cyclone Winston which caused 44 deaths and an estimated 2 billion FJ$ (US$900 million) in damage. The deadliest tropical cyclone was the February 1931 hurricane and flood which caused 225 deaths.

===== French Polynesia =====
The overseas collectivity of French Polynesia, located in the south Pacific Ocean, is occasionally affected by tropical cyclones, mainly from January to March. The Austral Islands are affected every 2–3 years, while the Marquesas are affected by strong cyclones once a century. In January 1903, a strong tropical cyclone struck the Tuamotus in French Polynesia, killing 515 people. In 1983, a series of five cyclones moved through French Polynesia, causing F16 billion (US$100 million) in damage. The fourth cyclone – Veena – produced wind gusts of 200 km/h (120 mph).

===== Mariana Islands =====
About once every five to six years, a typhoon strikes Guam, although the chances increase during El Niño events. In November 1900, Guam's strongest ever typhoon struck the island, killing 100 people. In November 1962, Typhoon Karen destroyed 95% of the homes on the island, and nearly every other building was damaged. In December 2002, Typhoon Pongsona struck Guam, inflicting US$700 million in damage.

In October 2018, Typhoon Yutu became the strongest typhoon on record to strike the Northern Marianas when it hit the island of Tinian with estimated winds of 280 km/h (170 mph). Yutu killed two people and injured 133 in the territory.

===== Marshall Islands =====
Typhoons typically affect the Marshall Islands from September to November, with stronger storms occurring during El Niño events. In November 1992, high waves from Typhoon Gay killed one person in the country. In December 1997, Typhoon Paka moved across the islands, inflicting US$80 million worth of damage from its high winds and waves.

===== New Caledonia =====
Each year, 3.6 tropical cyclones move through the waters around New Caledonia, an archipelago in the South Pacific Ocean. This includes the average 1.7 storms that are a Category 3 or higher on the Australian cyclone scale, or with sustained winds of at least 119 km/h (74 mph). In January 1880, a cyclone moved across the southern portion of the island, killing 16 people; its winds were estimated over 200 km/h (120 mph). In 1959, Cyclone Beatrice produced a minimum pressure of 939 mbar at Poindimié, and dropped 750 mm (30 in) of rainfall over three days. In March 2003, Cyclone Erica struck New Caledonia and inflicted US$15 million in damage.

===== New Zealand =====
In April 1968, Cyclone Giselle passed near New Zealand and sank the TEV Wahine, a car ferry; 51 people died in the shipwreck, while two people later died from their injuries, making it New Zealand's worst modern maritime disaster. In March 1988, the remnants of Cyclone Bola created some of the largest rainfall totals for a single storm in the history of New Zealand, reaching 917 mm (36.1 in) near Tolaga Bay. Floods and landslides damaged houses and farmlands, with agriculture damage estimated at NZ$90 million. In January 2011, Cyclone Wilma became the first tropical cyclone to strike the country.

===== Niue =====
The island of Niue is affected by a severe tropical cyclone about once every ten years. Storms usually affect the island from November to March. In January 2004, Cyclone Heta passed near the island at peak intensity, producing peak wind gusts of 286.8 km/h (178.2 mph), and a minimum pressure of 945 mbar (27.9 inHg) before the barometer failed; both observations set records for the island. Heta damaged most of the island's infrastructure, with monetary damage estimated at NZ$50 million (US$32 million). Two people died during the storm.

===== Palau =====
From the period of 1945 to 2013, 68 tropical cyclones approached within 370 km (230 mi) of Palau, an island archipelago east of the Philippines. About once every three years, a typhoon affects the country, with most storms occurring in November or December. In December 2012, Typhoon Bopha passed just south of Palau, producing wind gusts of 133 km/h (83 mph), as well as estimated 12 m (40 ft) waves. Damage was estimated at US$10 million. A year later, Typhoon Haiyan struck Palau with estimated wind gusts of 280 km/h (170 mph), which also left around US$10 million in damage.

===== Papua New Guinea =====
Due to its proximity to the equator, the northern coast of Papua New Guinea is rarely affected by tropical cyclones, although the southern portion of the country is more commonly affected. About every other year, a tropical cyclone passes within 400 km (250 mi) of the country's capital, Port Moresby, usually during El Niño events. In 2007, heavy rainfall from Cyclone Guba killed 149 people.

===== Samoan Islands =====
Tropical cyclones routinely affect the Samoan Islands, an archipelago in the South Pacific Ocean including the nation of Samoa and American Samoa. On average, six tropical cyclones passed near or over the Samoa Islands every decade, typically between November and April. In March 1889, a cyclone moved through the Samoa Islands during the Samoan crisis between Germany and the United States; the cyclone wrecked six warships, killing at least 201 people. In February 1990, Cyclone Ofa struck Samoa, producing wind gusts of 150 km/h (95 mph). It left US$130 million in damage in Samoa and US$50 million in American Samoa. Less than two years later, Cyclone Val moved through the Samoan islands in December 1991. In Samoa, Val inflicted more than US$330 in damage, twice the annual GDP, and there were 15 deaths. Damage from Val in neighboring American Samoa was estimated at US$100 million.

===== Solomon Islands =====
Each year, one to two tropical cyclones move through the Solomon Islands in the South Pacific Ocean. Due to the islands' low latitude, storms are usually not fully developed while in the region. Cyclones typically affect the Solomon Islands from November to April. However, Cyclone Namu moved through the archipelago in May 1986, killing at least 111 people and causing US $100 million in economic losses. In December 2002, Cyclone Zoe moved through the southern Solomon Islands as one of the strongest tropical cyclones on record, producing estimated wind gusts of 320 km/h (200 mph).

===== Tokelau =====
The South Pacific island of Tokelau typically experiences tropical cyclones during El Niño events, with a significant storm about once every decade. In February 1990, Cyclone Ofa damaged roads, power, and the water supply in Tokelau.

===== Tonga =====
The South Pacific island nation of Tonga experiences an average of 1.7 tropical cyclones per year, more often during El Niño events. Storms typically occur between November and April. In February 2018, Cyclone Gita struck Tonga with winds of 233 km/h (145 mph), causing severe damage estimated at T$356.1 million (US$164.1 million), with two deaths.

===== Tuvalu =====
Tropical cyclones typically affect the south Pacific Island nation of Tuvalu from November to April. On average, there are 0.8 tropical cyclones that affect the country each year, which are more likely to occur during El Niño events. In March 2015, Cyclone Pam left nearly half of the archipelago's population homeless, with damage estimated at US$92 million.

===== Vanuatu =====
Each year, 2–3 tropical cyclones pass near the South Pacific nation of Vanuatu, primarily in January and February. In February 1987, Cyclone Uma moved through Vanuatu, killing 49 people and leaving US$72 million in damage. In March 2015, Cyclone Pam moved through the islands, causing an estimated VT63.2 billion (US$600 million) in damage.

===== Wallis and Futuna =====
Each year, 1.8 tropical cyclones approach the South Pacific territory of Wallis and Futuna. In December 1986, Cyclone Raja stalled near the territory, producing a record 24-hour rainfall total of 674.9 mm (26.57 in) on Futuna. In December 2012, Cyclone Evan passed near the territory, producing wind gusts of 156 km/h (97 mph), the highest ever recorded on Wallis Island since records began in 1971.

=== Europe ===
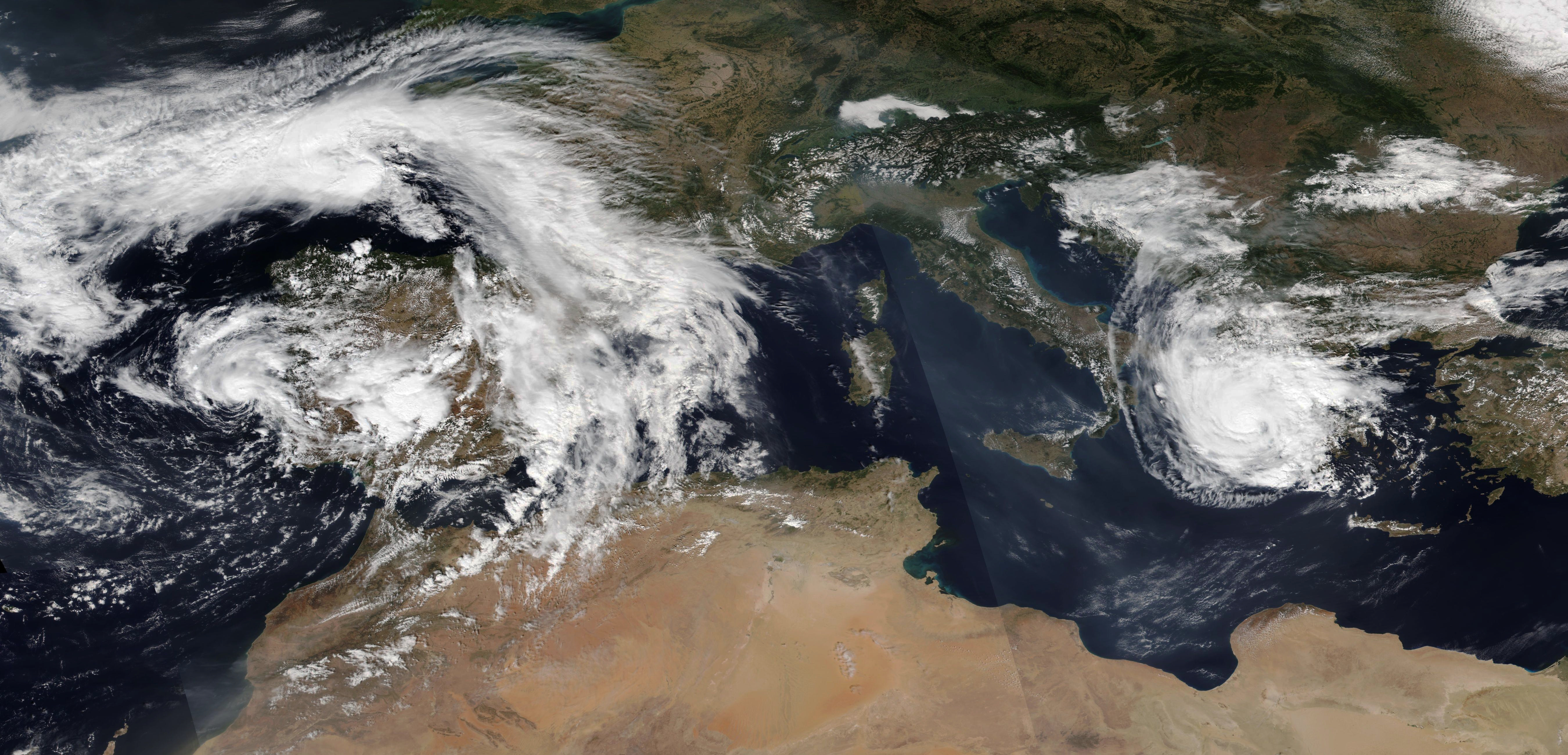
Subtropical Storm Alpha (left) and Cyclone Ianos (right) on 18 September 2020, both of which impacted Europe; Ianos was a Mediterranean tropical-like cyclone

Atlantic hurricanes occasionally affect Europe after they have transitioned into an extratropical cyclone, but they rarely strike the continent while still tropical. In October 2005, a tropical depression – formerly Hurricane Vince – made landfall near Huelva, Spain, the only tropical cyclone on record to strike the continent. There was possibly a hurricane in 1842 that struck southwestern Spain. In October 2020, Subtropical Storm Alpha struck Portugal, marking the first ever subtropical cyclone to strike the country.

Mediterranean tropical-like cyclones (also known as Medicanes) form in the Mediterranean Sea, and they can sometimes have tropical or subtropical characteristics. In September 2020, Cyclone Ianos struck Greece, leaving US$100 million in damage and causing four deaths.

==== Azores ====
The Portuguese territory of the Azores is located in the northeast Atlantic Ocean. There are nine major islands and an islet cluster. In three main groups, there are Flores and Corvo islands to the west; Graciosa, Terceira, São Jorge, Pico, and Faial islands in the center; and São Miguel and Santa Maria islands, and the islet cluster of Formigas Reef to the east.

In 2019, Hurricane Lorenzo struck the islands, with wind gusts reaching as high as 163 km/h (101 mph) on Corvo Island. The commercial port in Lajes das Flores (the only one on Flores Island) was heavily damaged; the port building and some cargo containers were swept away, and the dock was partially damaged. 53 people were left homeless after the storm passed, and in total $367 million (2019 USD) of damage was caused by the storm.

Hurricane Emmy in 1976 caused a Venezuelan Air Force plane en route from Caracas to Spain to crash into the side of a hill on Terceira Island, killing all 68 people on board.

=== North America, Central America, and islands in the North Atlantic ===
==== North America ====
===== Canada =====
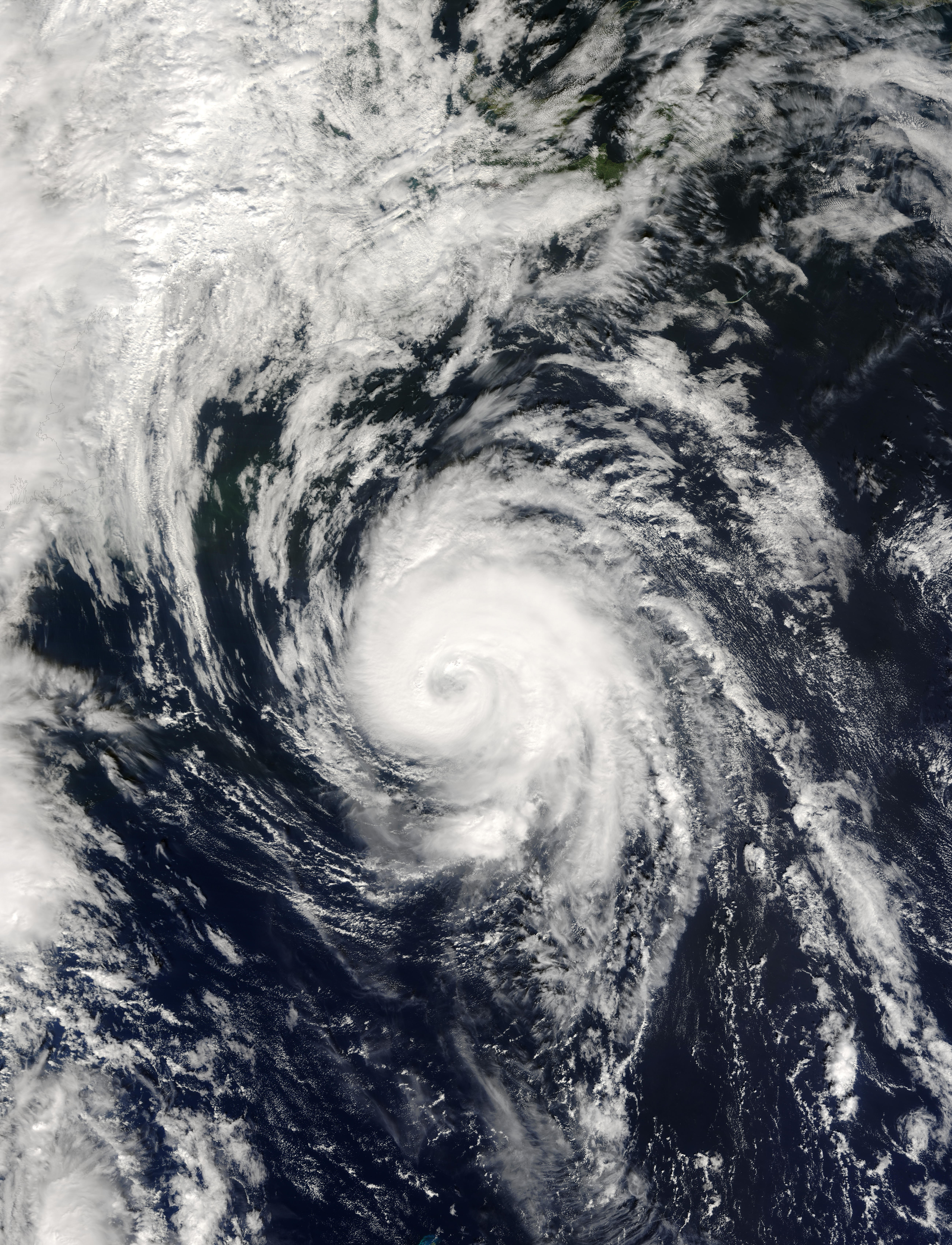
Hurricane Juan south of Nova Scotia near peak intensity

About once every three years, a hurricane or a hurricane-force post-tropical cyclone strike Canada. Canada's deadliest hurricane on record occurred in September 1775, when a hurricane killed 4,000 people in Newfoundland, mostly sailors and fishermen. The hurricane produced a 6.1 to 9.1 m (20 to 30 ft) storm surge, which wrecked more than 200 fishing boats. In 1873, a hurricane killed at least 223 people after passing south of Nova Scotia and making landfall on Newfoundland. Some sources indicated that at least 600 people died from the hurricane; a significant amount of the fatalities were sailors lost at sea.

One of Canada's worst natural disasters of the 20th century was Hurricane Hazel, which struck the southeastern United States, and later unleashed torrential rainfall over Toronto. The hurricane killed 81 people and left C$100 million in damage, making it the country's deadliest inland tropical cyclone. In September 2003, Hurricane Juan made landfall on Nova Scotia's capital Halifax, resulting in C$300 million in damage, and the worst damage for the city since 1893. In September 2010, Hurricane Igor left nearly US$200 million in damage in Newfoundland, making it the costliest hurricane for the island.

The strongest hurricane on record to make landfall in Canada was Hurricane Ginny, which made landfall in October 1963 as a high-end category 2 hurricane with winds of 175 km/h (109 mph). Hurricane Luis produced a 30 m (98 ft) wave in Canadian waters, which is the largest wave recorded from a tropical cyclone on record.

===== Mexico =====
From 1951 to 2000, there were 92 hurricanes that struck Mexico, 70% of which affected the Pacific coast. During the same time period, the most affected states were Baja California Sur and Sinaloa. September is the most active month for the country. There were only four Category 5 Atlantic hurricane landfalls in Mexico; three were in the state of Quintana Roo along the eastern Yucatán Peninsula – Janet in 1955, Gilbert in 1988, and Dean in 2007 – while one, Anita in 1977, hit Tamaulipas. Mexico's strongest landfall on record from a Pacific hurricane was Hurricane Otis in October 2023, which hit the state of Guerrero with estimated sustained winds of 260 km/h (160 mph), becoming the first known Category 5 hurricane to make landfall in the Eastern Pacific basin.

===== United States =====
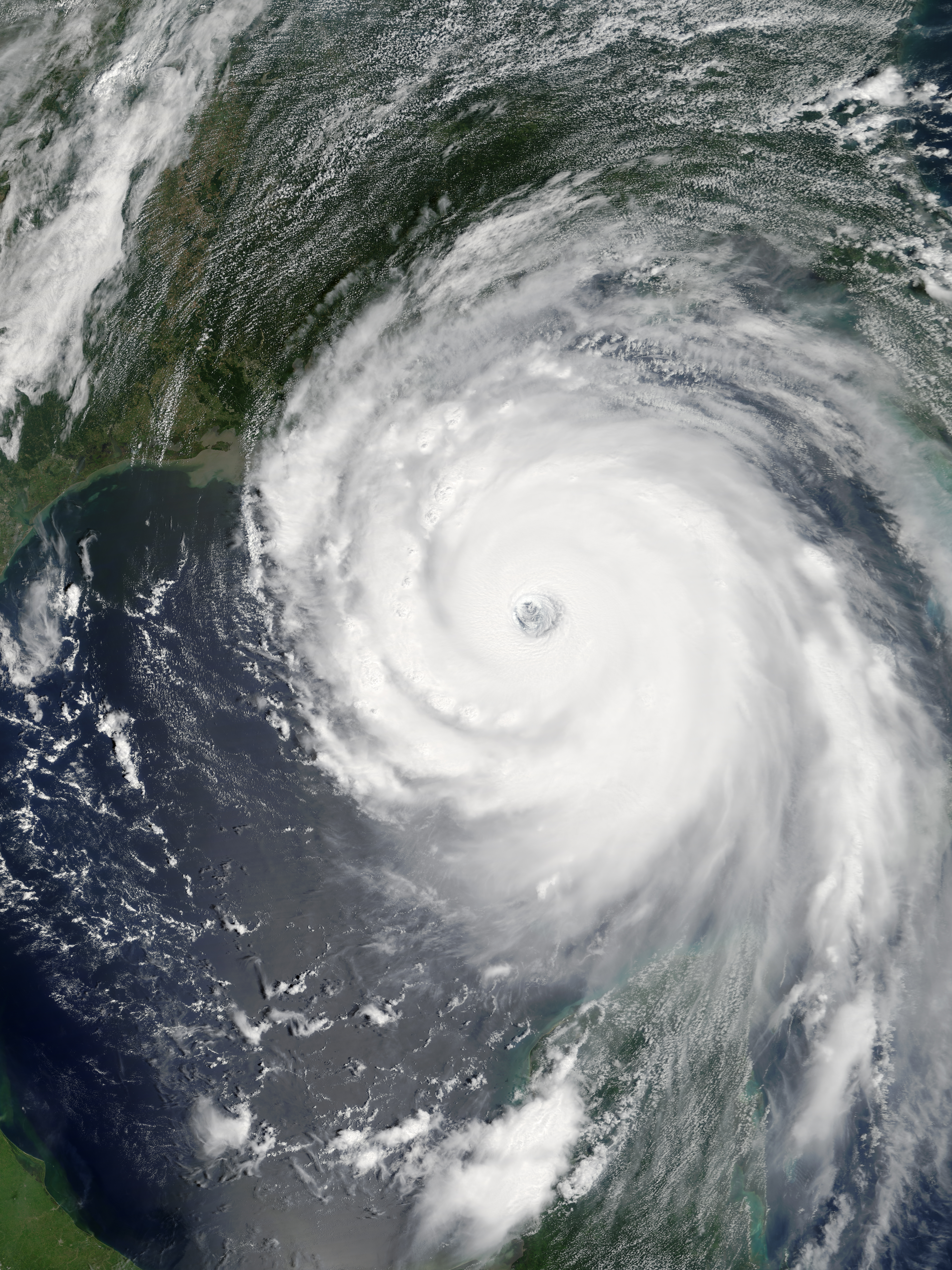
Satellite image of Hurricane Katrina, tied for the costliest American hurricane, and the deadliest in the country since 1928

In September 1900, a powerful hurricane struck Galveston, Texas, killing 8,000–12,000 people, making it the deadliest hurricane on record in the United States. In August 2005, Hurricane Katrina struck southeastern Louisiana and later struck Mississippi; the hurricane killed 1,833 people in the United States and left US$125 billion in damage, making it the country's costliest hurricane. In August 2017, Hurricane Harvey dropped torrential rainfall as it moved across Texas, reaching 60.58 in (1,539 mm) near Nederland; this was the highest rainfall total on record in the country. The rains caused significant flooding that left US$125 billion in damage, tying Katrina as the costliest American hurricane. The most intense hurricane on record in the United States was the 1935 Labor Day hurricane, a Category 5 hurricane with a pressure of 892 mbar (26.3 inHg) when it moved across the Florida Keys. The only other Category 5 hurricanes to hit the continental United States were Hurricane Camille in 1969, Hurricane Andrew in 1992, and Hurricane Michael in 2018.

From 1851 to 2019, a total of 293 hurricanes made landfall or produced hurricane-force winds in the states along the Atlantic coast. This includes 19 in June, 27 in July, 78 in August, 108 in September, 58 in October, and 3 in November. On 6 June 1966, Hurricane Alma became the earliest landfalling hurricane in the United States since a storm in 1825. The latest landfalling hurricane was Hurricane Kate in 1985, which struck Florida on November 21 of that year. The year with the most tropical storm or hurricane landfalls in the country was 2020 with ten. In addition to the landfalls on the Atlantic coast, a hurricane in October 1858 affected San Diego, California. In 1992, Hurricane Iniki became the strongest hurricane on record to strike Hawaii, inflicting US$1.8 billion in damage to become the state's costliest hurricane.

==== Central America ====
===== Belize =====
About once a decade, a major hurricane strikes the nation of Belize, located on the eastern Yucatán Peninsula. In September 1931, a hurricane struck Belize City when the areas was known as British Honduras; it killed 2,500 people, making it the deadliest hurricane in the country's history. In October 1961, powerful Hurricane Hattie also struck Belize City, forcing the capital city to move inland.

===== Costa Rica =====
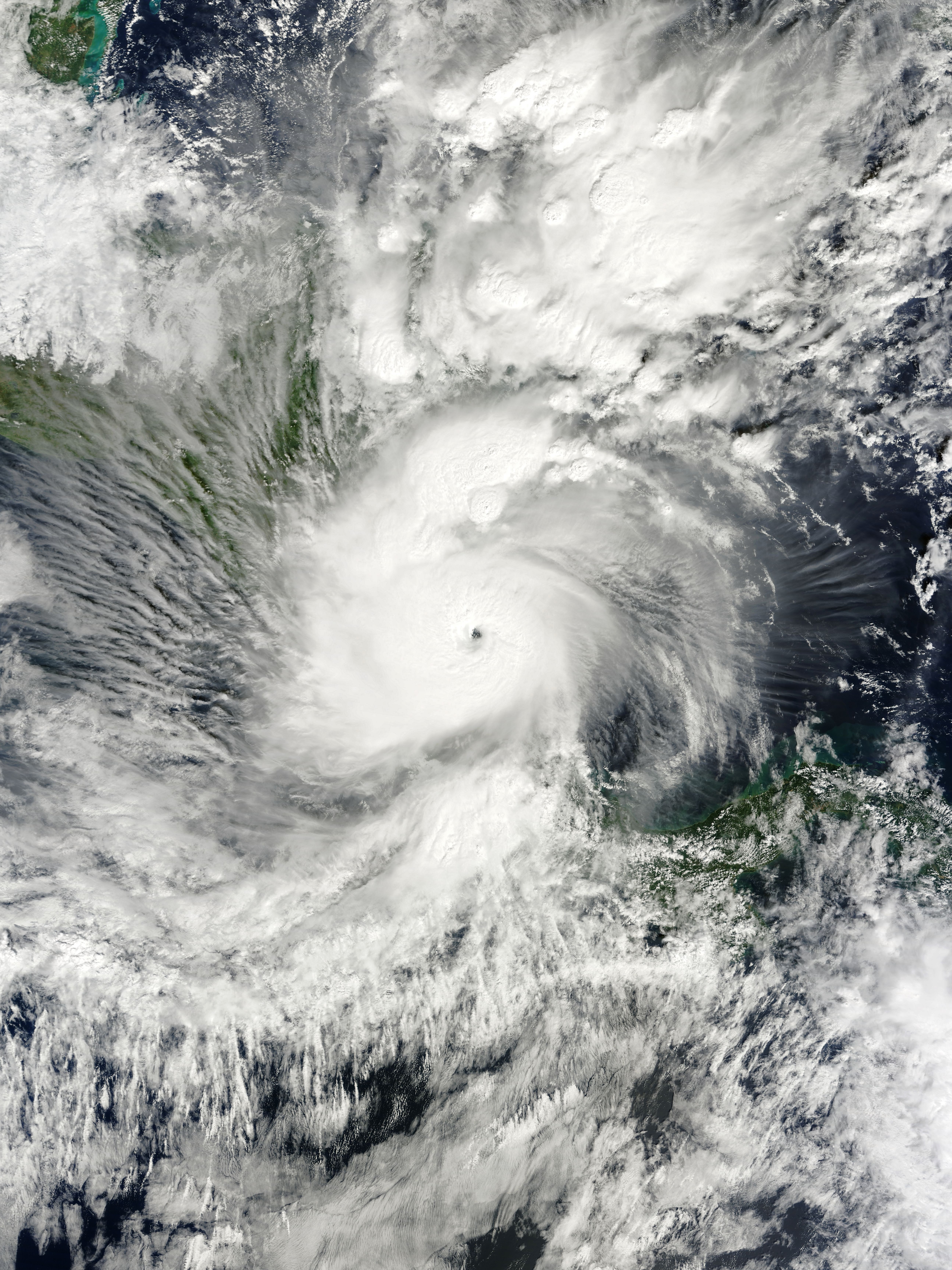
Hurricane Otto near landfall just north of Costa Rica

Costa Rica rarely gets hit by hurricanes, due to its low latitude; only 18 tropical cyclones have affected the country, and only 2 of those have made landfall in Costa Rica. However, several of these have been very deadly or destructive.

In October 2017, Hurricane Nate affected the country, becoming the costliest natural disaster in Costa Rican history, with damages of $562 million (2017 USD). Heavy rains occurred across the country, peaking at 487 mm (19.2 in) of rainfall in Maritima, and there were reports of over 254 mm (10.0 in) of rain in several locations. 800 people had to be rescued, 11,300 people were forced into shelters, and 14 people died as a result of Nate in Costa Rica. In late November 2016, Hurricane Otto passed over Costa Rica, despite making landfall just north of the border with Nicaragua. Some areas of Costa Rica received over a month's worth of rainfall from the storm. 10 people died in Costa Rica as a result of Otto's passing, and damage from the storm in the country was totaled at $192.2 million (2016 USD).

Hurricane Cesar brought heavy rains to the country in July 1996, causing mudslides and widespread flooding. At least 39 people died and 29 more people were labeled as missing after the storm in Costa Rica; damages were estimated at $151 million (1996 USD). Hurricane Mitch in 1998 brought heavy rain, causing flash flooding and mudslides. 4,000 people were made homeless after the storm in the country, 7 people died, and $92 million (1998 USD) in damage was brought by Mitch. Hurricane Joan killed 28 people and left 18 missing in the country, while leaving behind $65 million (1988 USD) in damage in 1998. An unnamed tropical storm in 1887 and a tropical depression in 1973 are the only storms to make landfall in Costa Rica on record.

===== El Salvador =====
In September 1982, a tropical depression moved ashore the El Salvador and Guatemala border, which later became Hurricane Paul. The depression dropped torrential rainfall that led to 761 fatalities. In October 1998, former Hurricane Mitch moved through the country as a tropical depression, causing US$400 million in damage and 240 deaths. In October 2017, Tropical Storm Selma became the first tropical storm on record to strike El Salvador.

===== Guatemala =====
In October 2005, rains from Hurricane Stan, along with a broader weather system, dropped torrential rainfall across Guatemala, causing widespread floods and landslides; the events led to 1,513 deaths and US$996 million in damage.

===== Honduras =====
In September 1974, Hurricane Fifi paralleled the north coast of Honduras, triggering torrential rainfall that caused flooding and landslides. The storm inflicted US$1.8 billion in damage, producing the nation's worst natural disaster at the time. The death toll in the country was estimated between 8,000–10,000. In October 1998, Hurricane Mitch stalled off shore Honduras before weakening, moving southward, and striking the country. Torrential rainfall in the country – estimated as high as 1,900 mm (75 in) in the mountains – caused flooding and landslides. The storm wrecked about 35,000 houses and damaged another 50,000, leaving up to 1.5 million people homeless, or about 20% of the country's population. Damage totaled over US$2 billion, and there were more than 7,000 fatalities.

===== Nicaragua =====
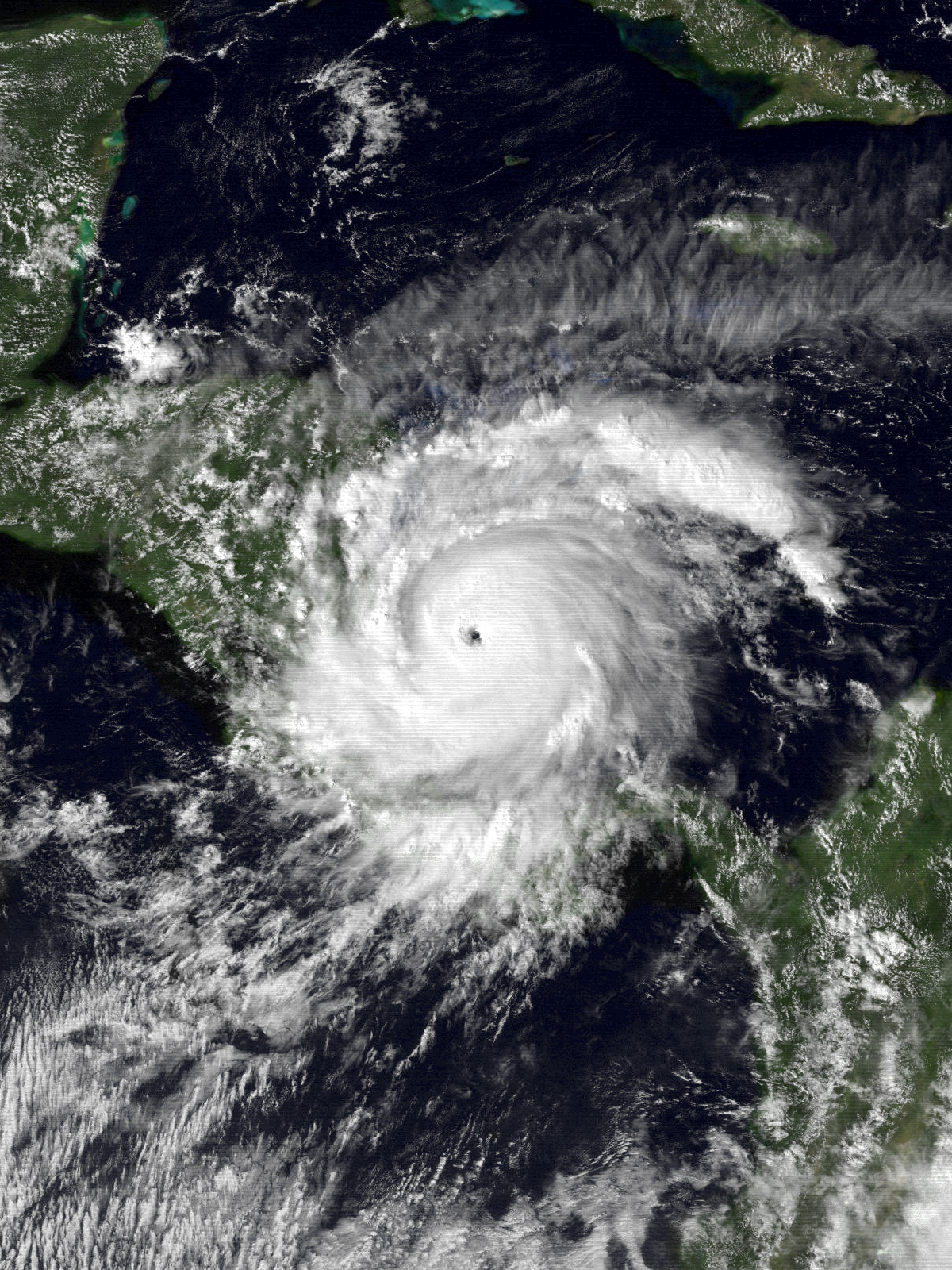
Hurricane Joan–Miriam prior to landfall on Nicaragua

Tropical cyclones make landfall in Nicaragua once every few years, usually from the Atlantic Ocean. In 1998, Hurricane Mitch brought extreme damage and destruction to the country. As much as 630 mm (25 in) of rain fell in some coastal areas, with this rain causing a lahar at the Casita volcano in northwestern Nicaragua. A mudslide occurred as a result, which would grow to 16 km (9.9 mi) long and 8 km (5.0 mi) wide; in areas around the volcano, over 2,000 people died. Overall, at least 3,800 people died in Nicaragua from Mitch, 7,000 people were reported missing, and 500,000–800,000 people were left homeless after the storm. Damages in the country were estimated at $1 billion (1998 USD), making it the costliest hurricane on record in the country, in addition to the deadliest.

In October 1988, Hurricane Joan made landfall on Nicaragua, just south of Bluefields. Bluefields was particularly hard hit, as almost all structures in the city were damaged, with many of the main buildings in the city having been destroyed. Overall, across Nicaragua, Joan killed 148 people and left 100 others missing; the storm caused $751 million (1988 USD) in damage in the country. Hurricane Felix made landfall in northern Nicaragua as a Category 5 hurricane during 2007, the first storm to do so in the country. 130 people died in Nicaragua as a result of Felix, and $716.3 million (2007 USD) in damage was reported. During November 2020, hurricanes Eta and Iota made landfall in Nicaragua, both as Category 4 hurricanes. Eta caused $178.4 million (2020 USD) in damage and killed 2 people, while Iota was much more destructive, killing 28 people and causing $564 million (2020 USD) in damage. Tropical Storm Alma is the only tropical cyclone on record to make landfall on the Pacific coast of Nicaragua.

===== Panama =====
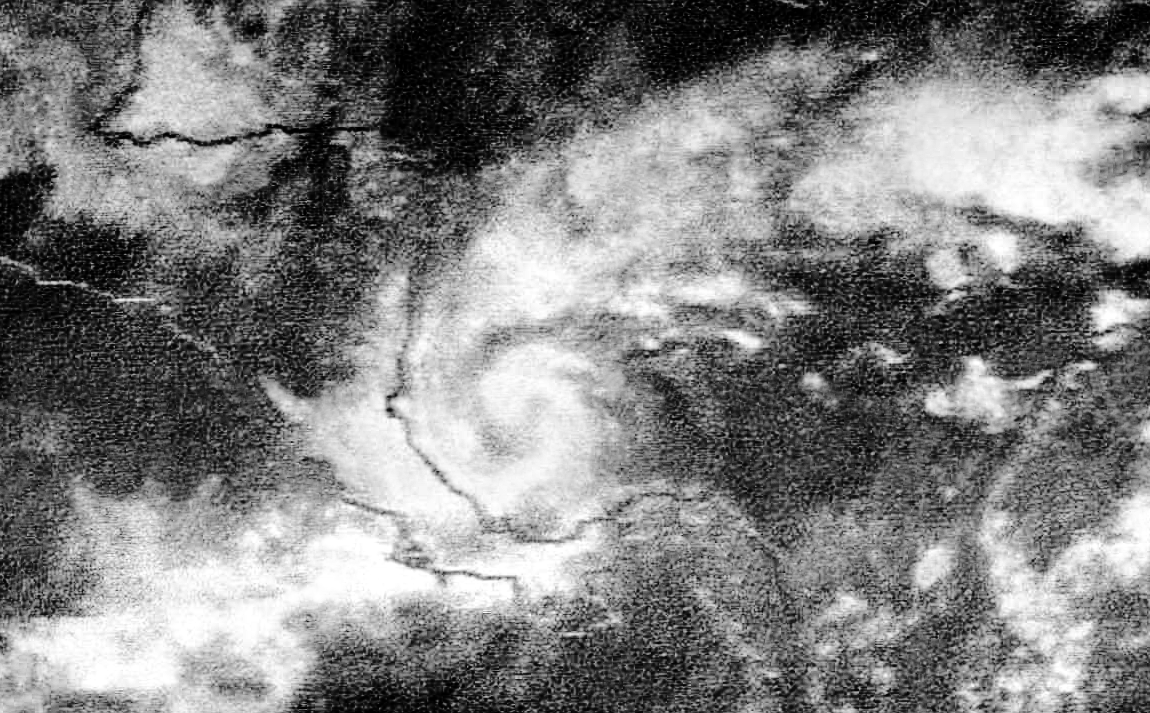
Hurricane Martha north of Panama as a strong tropical storm

Only one tropical cyclone has ever made landfall on Panama in recorded history. In late November 1969, Hurricane Martha formed north of Panama, and took an unusual track south before eventually making landfall in the country. At least 330 mm (13 in) of rain fell in Almirante, flooding half of the land of the city, causing extensive crop damage. Armuelles reported continuous rain, which caused street flooding and inundation of other areas. In November 2020, hurricanes Eta and Iota impacted Panama; the former was the deadliest hurricane on record in the country, killing 19 people and leaving 12 more missing. Over 200 homes were damaged as a result of Eta, and $11 million (2020 USD) in damages to agriculture was estimated in the country. In addition, Iota killed 3 people in Panama, and left 1 more missing.

Hurricane Joan caused $60 million (1988 USD) in damages in Panama and killed 7 people in 1988, mostly due to heavy rainfall and mudslides. In 2016, Hurricane Otto's outer bands caused rainfall which led to landslides and flooding, which led to 6 people dying on Panamanian soil. Offshore from Colón, 3 people died when the ship Jessica sank; the other 3 crew on the ship were rescued. The precursor disturbance to Hurricane Nate in 2017 brought flooding rains and strong gusts to western and central parts of Panama. 84 houses were damaged or destroyed in incidents related to Nate, and 4,975 people were affected. A landslide in Ngäbe-Buglé Comarca killed 6 people, and another person died in a shipwreck in Panama Bay. Hurricane Mitch in 1998 killed 3 people in Panama, and caused $50,000 (1998 USD) in damages. Hurricane Beta's outer bands brought heavy rain to Panama, resulting in flooding and landslides. At least 52 homes were damaged and 256 people were affected, but the monetary value of the damages is unknown. Three people died and two more were left missing in incidents related to Beta; a young girl died after a boat she was on sank, two people drowned in the Chagres River after being swept away by it, and two people were reported missing after they were shipwrecked.

==== Islands in the North Atlantic Ocean ====
===== Bermuda =====
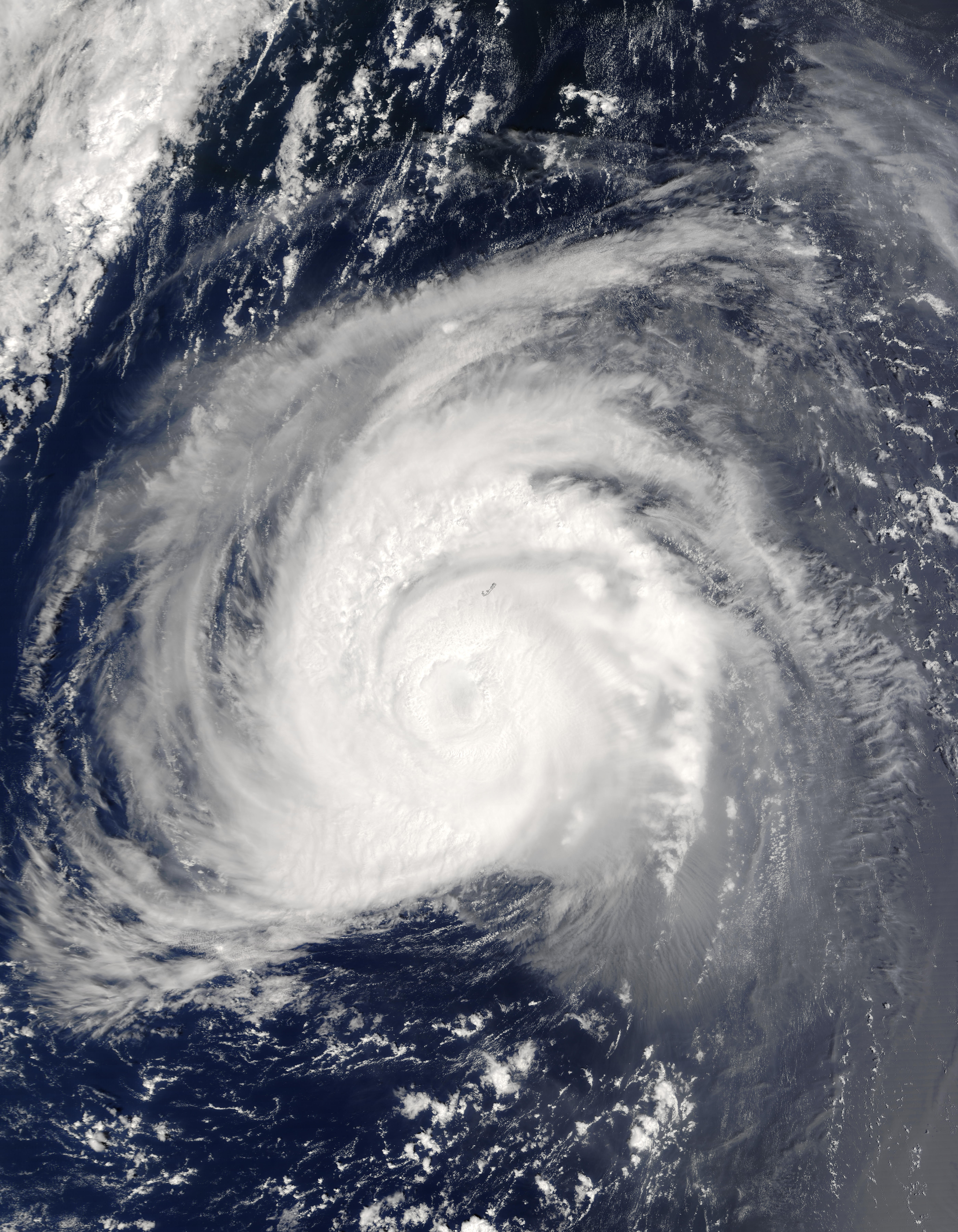
Hurricane Fabian approaching Bermuda as a Category 3 hurricane

The island of Bermuda is located in the North Atlantic Ocean, about 1,000 km (620 mi) east-southeast of Cape Hatteras, North Carolina. Due to the small size of Bermuda, only 10 tropical cyclones have made direct landfalls in the territory since 1851, though many more storms have produced impacts. In 2003, Hurricane Fabian passed 23 km (14 mi) west of Bermuda as a Category 3 hurricane with winds of 195 km/h (120 mph); the island entered the eastern eyewall of the hurricane. A maximum wind gust of 264 km/h (164 mph) was recorded at Bermuda Harbour Radio. A storm surge estimated at 3–3.5 m (9.8–11.5 ft) and waves of 7–10 m (23–33 ft) were reported during Fabian's passage. Approximately 25,000 of the 32,031 power customers on the island lost power as a result of Fabian. Fabian was the first hurricane since 1926 to cause a death on the island, killing 4 people; in addition, it also caused $300 million (2003 USD) in damage.

In a span of 6 days in October 2014, hurricanes Fay and Gonzalo both made landfall on Bermuda, which led to 2014 becoming the first season to have multiple landfalls on Bermuda on record. Fay caused gusts well in excess of 160 km/h (100 mph) as a Category 1 hurricane at several higher elevation stations, with a peak of 198 km/h (123 mph) at Commissioner's Point. Nearly 28,000 of the 35,500 electricity customers on the island lost power as a result of Fay. A definite $3.8 million (2014 USD) in damage was recorded from Fay, though this number was from only one insurance company; the Bermuda Weather Service estimated the total damages at "tens of millions of dollars". Gonzalo struck as a Category 2, causing gusts as high as 232 km/h (144 mph) on St. David's. Out of the 35,500 electricity customers on the island, 31,000 electricity customers were without power at the peak of the storm. In total, an estimated $200–400 million (2014 USD) in damage was recorded from Gonzalo. Impacts were very similar and hard to distinguish between both storms, though no deaths were reported from either storm.

A hurricane made landfall on Bermuda as a Category 3 hurricane in October 1926, with sustained winds as high as 183 km/h (114 mph) recorded at Fort Prospect. The storm killed about 110 people near Bermuda due to sinking two ships, HMS Valeria and the SS Eastway. In July 1609, a hurricane was responsible for the first settlement on the island, when the British ship Sea Venture heading for Jamestown, Virginia became separated from her fleet. The crew ultimately found the island of Bermuda and ultimately purposefully ran the ship aground there.

===== Cayman Islands =====
In November 1932, a powerful hurricane passed near the Cayman Islands, producing a storm surge that inundated the islands; 109 people died during the storm, making it the territory's deadliest hurricane. In September 2004, Hurricane Ivan passed just south of Grand Cayman as a Category 5 hurricane; it killed two people and inflicted US$2.86 billion in damage.

===== Cuba =====
In November 1932, a powerful hurricane struck southeastern Cuba. The hurricane washed away much of the town of Santa Cruz del Sur from its 6.5 m (21.3 ft) storm surge. Across Cuba, the storm killed 3,033 people, making it the country's deadliest hurricane. In October 1963, Hurricane Flora made landfall in southeastern Cuba, and over the next four days drifted across the country. Santiago de Cuba recorded 100.39 in (2,550 mm) of rainfall from Flora, which is the highest rainfall total measured on Cuba from any rainfall event on record. Flora killed 1,750 people and left US$300 million in damage. In September 2017, Category 5 Hurricane Irma moved ashore the northern coast of Cuba, making it the first hurricane of such intensity to strike the island since 1924. Irma damaged 158,554 homes, of which 14,657 were destroyed. Throughout the country, the hurricane inflicted US$13.185 billion in damage and killed 10 people, making Irma the costliest tropical cyclone in Cuban history.

===== Hispaniola =====
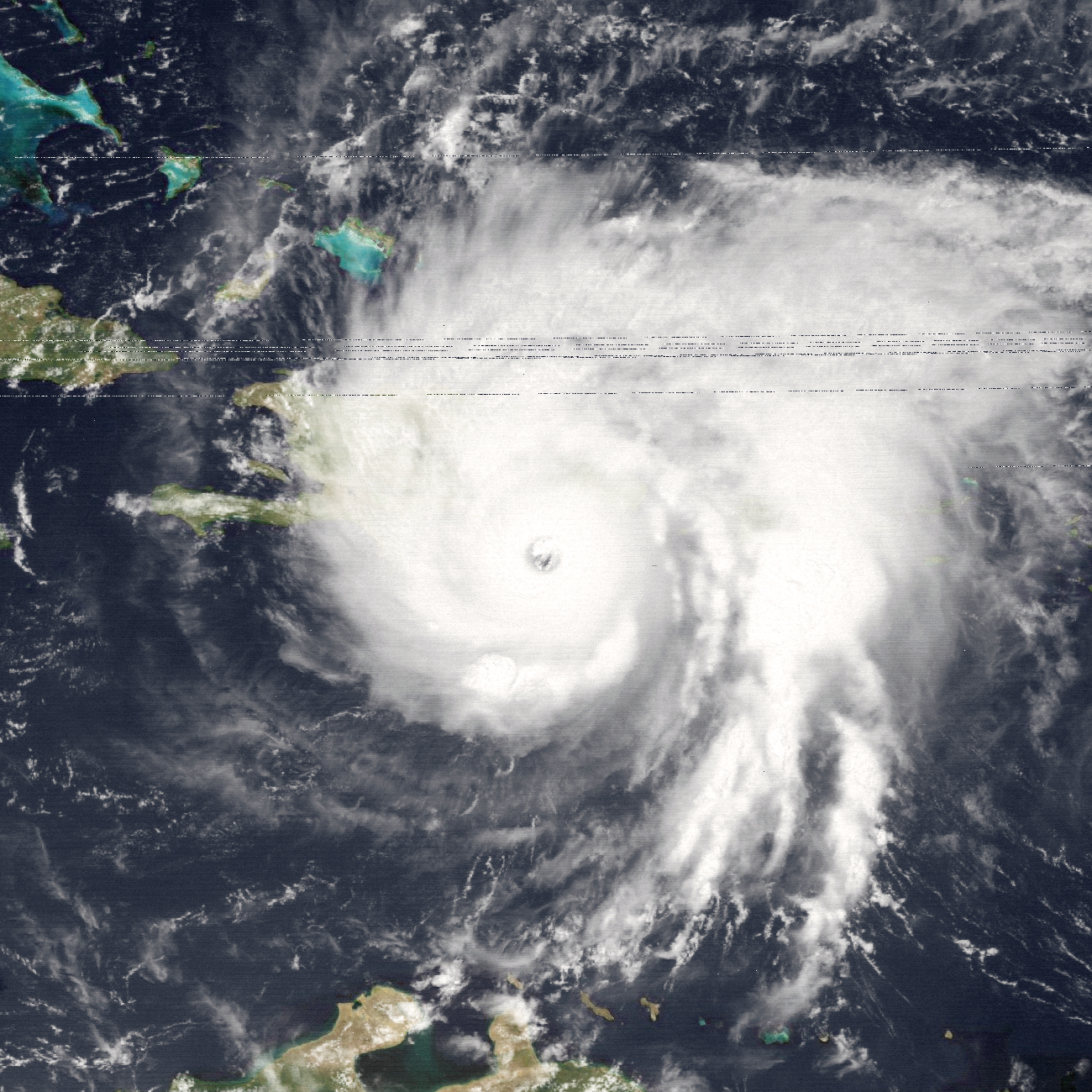
Hurricane David at peak intensity shortly before landfall in the Dominican Republic

Hispaniola is an island holding the countries of the Dominican Republic and Haiti that is also the second largest island in the Caribbean. Hispaniola has the Caribbean Sea to its south, the Atlantic Ocean to its north, the Mona Passage to its east, and the Windward Passage to the west.

In October 1963, Hurricane Flora struck Haiti near Sud, causing between $185 million and $240 million (1964 USD, $1.5 billion - $2 billion 2020 USD) in damage, and killing 5,000 people. In August 1979 Hurricane David struck the Dominican Republic with 280 km/h (175 mph) winds, causing $1 billion in damage (1979 USD, $3.5 billion 2020 USD) and killing 2,000 people.

In the year of 2008, 4 tropical cyclones impacted Hispaniola, causing hundreds of million of dollars in damage and killing 704 people. Fay made landfall in the Dominican Republic shortly after forming, killing 14 people. Gustav made landfall near Jacmel as a minimal hurricane, killing 85 people. Hanna, possibly the worst of the four, stalled north of Haiti, dropping more than a foot of rain in some places and killing 529. Finally, Ike passed north of Haiti, dropping heavy rainfall, and killing 76 people.

===== Jamaica =====
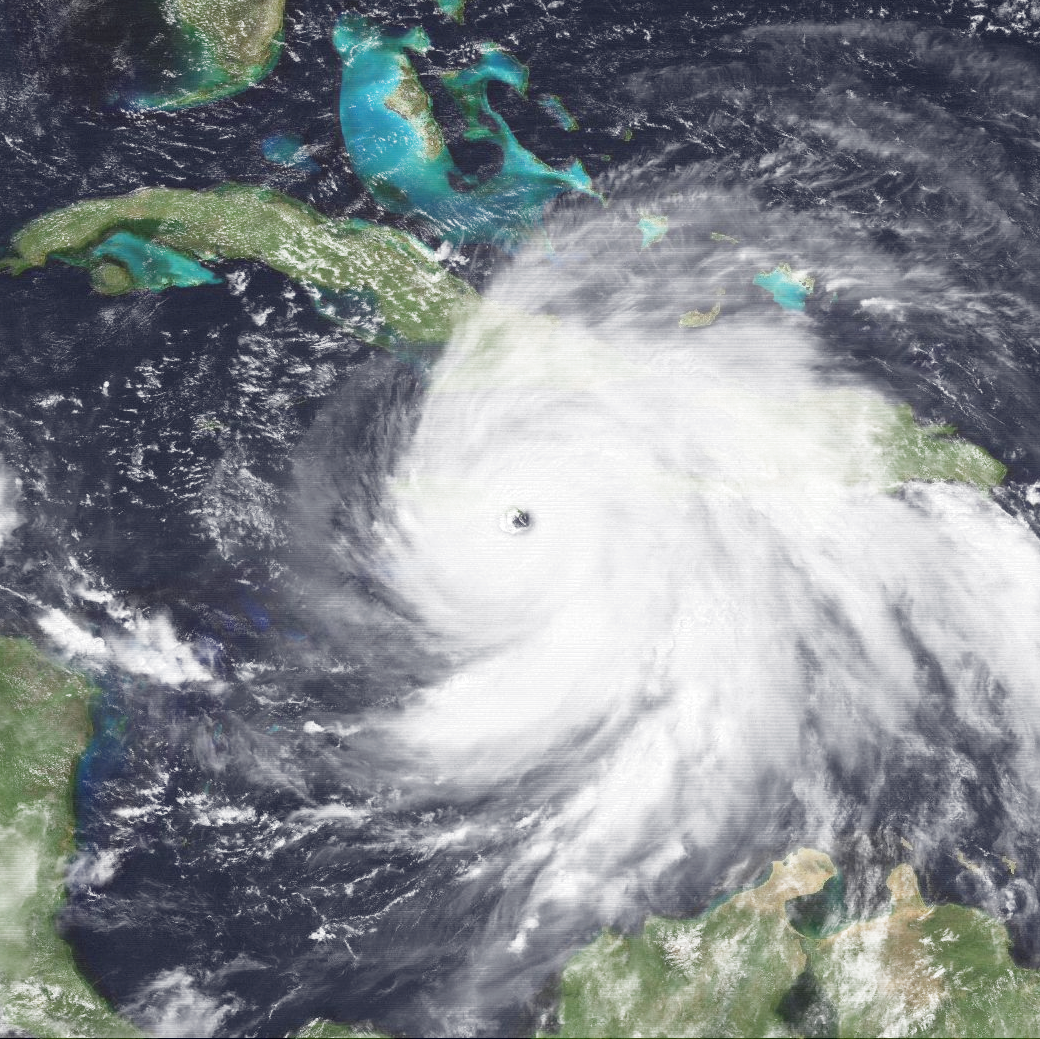
Hurricane Gilbert approaching Jamaica on 12 September

The island and country of Jamaica is located in the Caribbean Sea, south of the eastern edge of Cuba.

Hurricane Gilbert in September 1988 was the strongest and most damaging storm on record to make landfall in Jamaica until Hurricane Melissa, leaving $800 million (1989 USD) in damage as a Category 3 with winds of 125 mph (201 km/h). A storm in 1722 was the deadliest on record in Jamaica, killing roughly 400 people.

===== Lucayan Archipelago =====
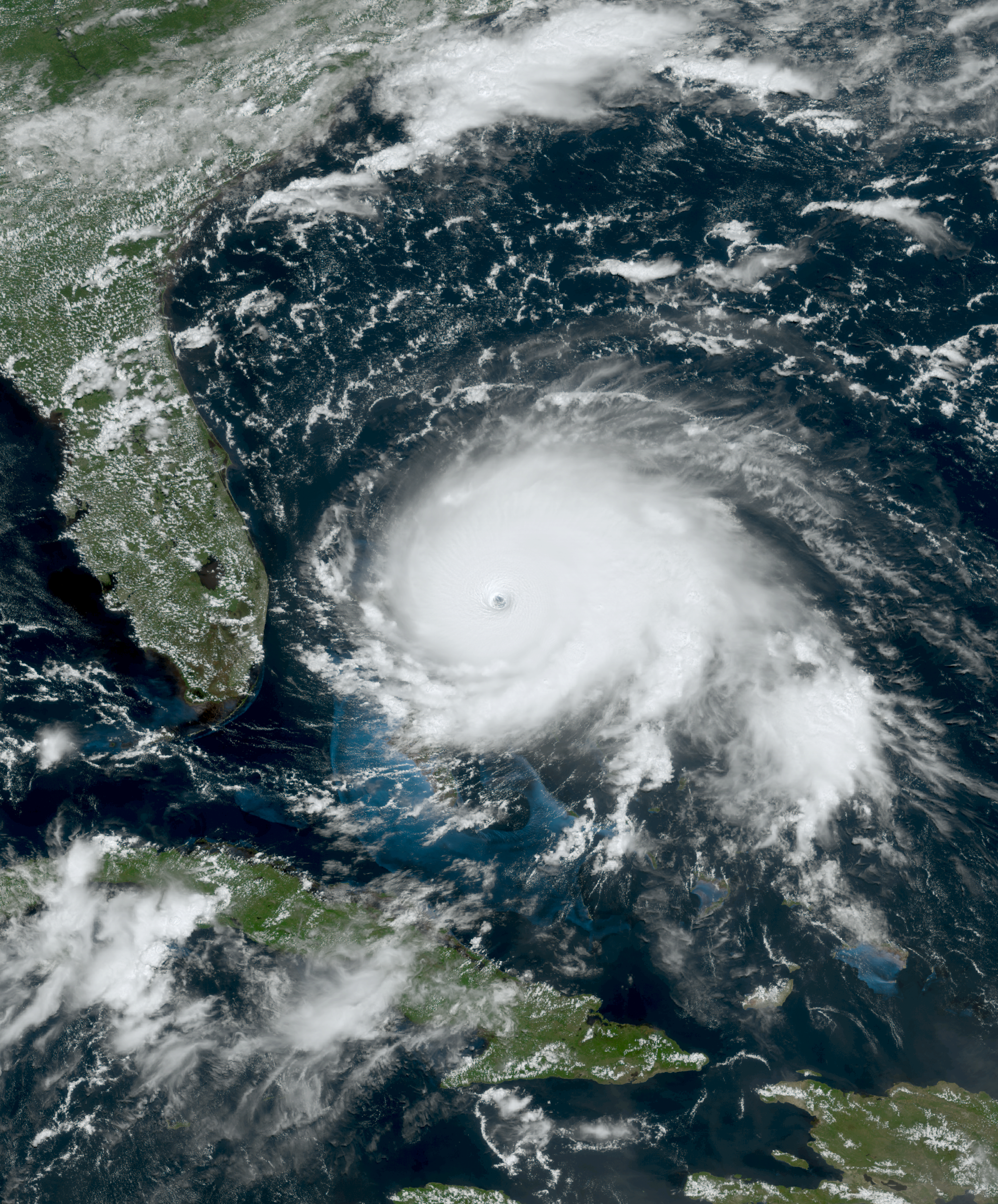
Satellite image of Hurricane Dorian at peak intensity while making landfall in the Abaco Islands on 1 September 2019, one of the strongest storms on record in the archipelago

The Bahamas and the Turks and Caicos Islands make up the Lucayan Archipelago, also known as the Bahama Archipelago. The island group is located east of Florida and north of the Greater Antilles.

The Lucayan Archipelago has seen four Category 5 hurricanes strike there, being the 1932 Bahamas hurricane, the 1933 Cuba–Brownsville hurricane, Hurricane Andrew in 1992, and Hurricane Dorian in 2019.

Hurricane Dorian in August 2019 was the strongest, deadliest, and most damaging hurricane to hit The Bahamas in recorded history, making landfall on Great Abaco island with winds of 185 mph (298 km/h) and a central pressure of 910 millibars (26.87 inHg). Dorian killed 74 people, and caused US$2.5 billion in damages.

===== Puerto Rico =====
The American territory of Puerto Rico has been struck by several significant hurricanes. In 1899, the San Ciriaco hurricane moved across the island, killing 3,369 people, making it the deadliest hurricane in the island's history. In 1928, a powerful hurricane struck the southeastern portion of the island as a Category 5 hurricane; it was the only hurricane of such intensity to strike the island. In September 2017, Hurricane Maria moved across the island, causing about US$90 billion in damage, as well as an island-wide power outage, making it the island's costliest natural disaster. The hurricane led to 2,975 deaths on the island.

=== South America ===
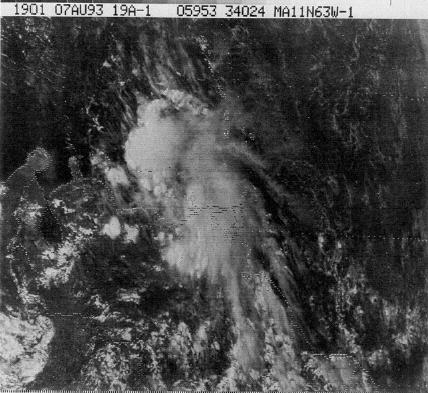
TS Bret impacting the north coast of Venezuela

In the continent of South America, northern Colombia and Venezuela have a 1 to 5% chance of a hurricane strike in any given year. In August 1993, Tropical Storm Bret made landfall in Venezuela and killed 173 people. The South Atlantic Ocean is generally inhospitable to the formation of a tropical storm., In June 2021, the predecessor extratropical cyclone of Subtropical Storm Raoni caused heavy rains and strong winds gust up to 104 km/h (65 mph), downing trees and causing damages to different public and private establishments across Punta del Este. The storm also brought rough surf, and downpours with continuous gales were also experienced in Uruguay's capital Montevideo. From 24 June to 2 July, Raoni channeled cold air from Antarctica into portions of South America, leading to an unusually potent cold wave across Argentina, Uruguay, Paraguay, Bolivia, and Brazil, with the temperature dropping as much as 15 °C (59 °F) below average in some areas. The combination of the cyclone and the cold wave also produced snowfall across the southern portion of South America, with snowfall observed as far north as southern Brazil, marking the 4th snowfall event observed there within the past century.

=== Brazil ===
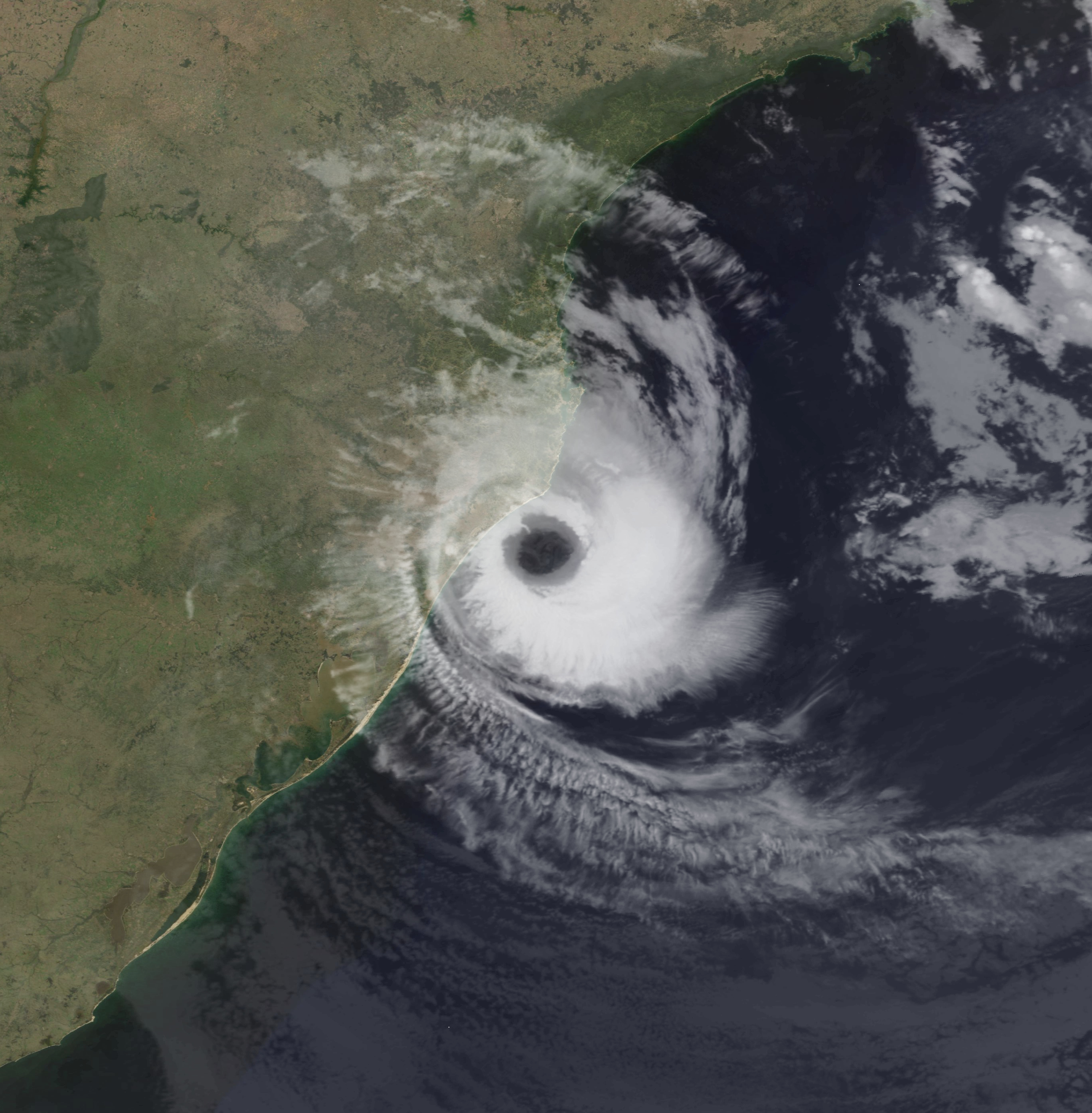
Hurricane Catarina making landfall on the Brazilian coast in 2004

Hurricanes and Tropical storms are rare in the South Atlantic Ocean but year around we can see some storms in the basin. Here we have some storms that impacted Brazil in the last years. On 28 March 2004, a system, dubbed Catarina by meteorologists, impacted the Brazilian coast as a Category 2 hurricane killing 11 people and causing $ 350 million in damage. This was the first ever hurricane recorded in the South Atlantic. Catarina brought heavy rainfall, flooding and landslides to eastern cities of Santa Catarina and Rio Grande do Sul. A Navy buoy registered a 6-metre (20-foot) wave off the coast of Santa Catarina. The Front associated with Kurumí would later play a role in the 2020 Brazilian floods and mudslides, producing heavy rainfall on 24 January, triggering a landslide and killing 3 people and leaving 1 missing. The storm caused significant damage in Espírito Santo, with landslides of stones and earth leaving more than 400 people homeless. Mani impacted almost the entire state of Minas Gerais and the northern region of Rio de Janeiro .More than 220,000 people were affected by power cuts in greater Porto Alegre and Campanha Gaúcha because of the Cyclone. Several power poles and cables were broken, leaving residents in the dark. On Lake Guaíba, the storm damaged a boat carrying three people, resulting in one of them drowning. The system caused $50 million in damage across Brazil and Uruguay, becoming one of the costliest storms in the basin.

== See also ==
- Effects of tropical cyclones
- Tropical cyclones and climate change
- List of deadliest natural disasters
