= Ar Riyan =

Coordinates: 14°39′N 49°20′E

- Interactive map of Ar Riyan
- Country: Yemen
- Governorate: Hadhramaut
- Time zone: UTC+3 (Yemen Standard Time)

Ar Riyan is a village in eastern Yemen. It is located in the Hadhramaut Governorate.

The Shuhayr village and the Riyan Airport are located nearby.
