= Cyclone Mekunu =

Category 3 North Indian Cyclone in 2018

Extremely Severe Cyclonic Storm Mekunu
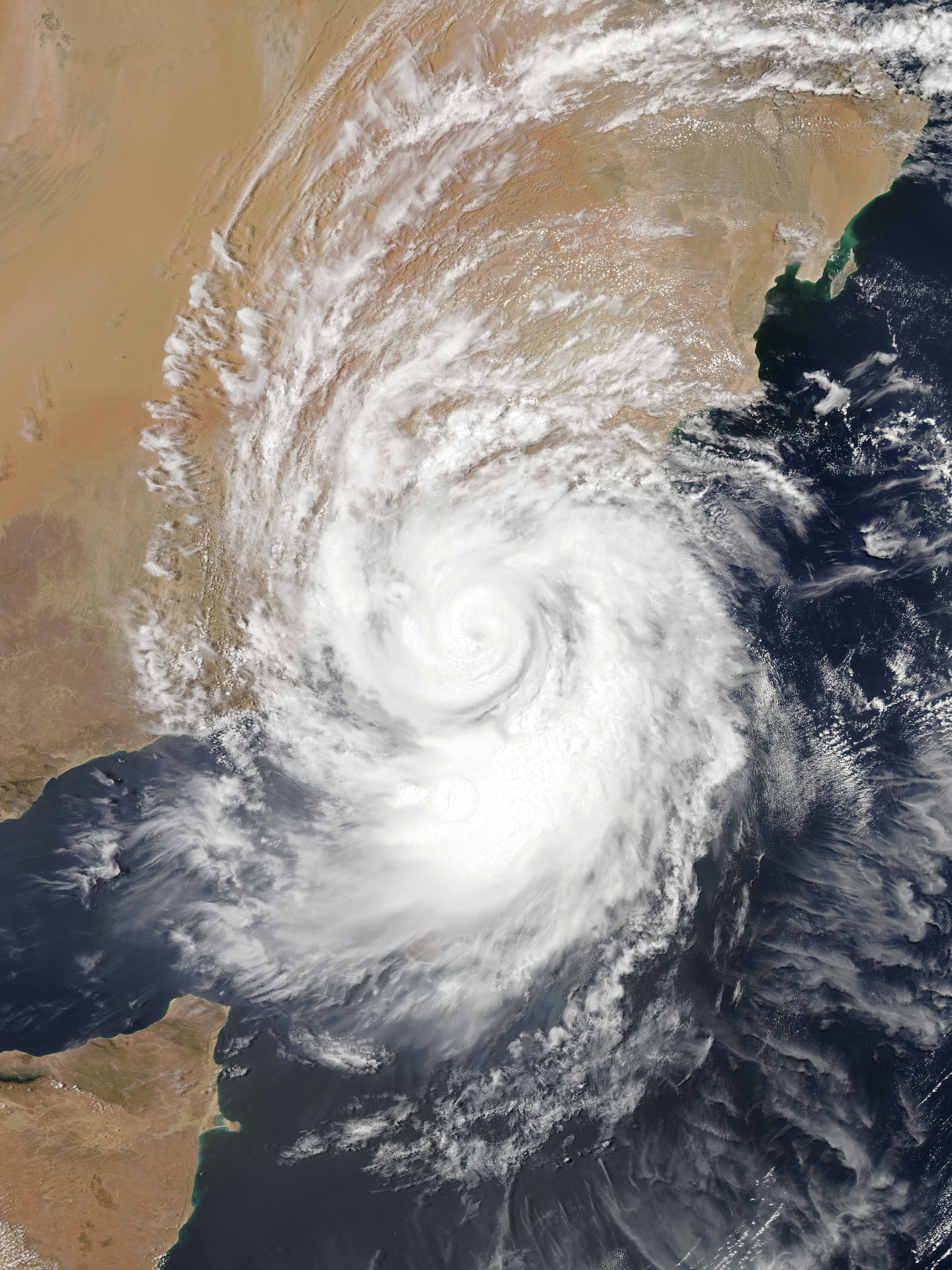
- Cyclone Mekunu near peak intensity and approaching Oman on May 25

Meteorological history
- Formed: May 21, 2018
- Dissipated: May 27, 2018

Extremely severe cyclonic storm
- 3-minute sustained (IMD)
- Highest winds: 175 km/h (110 mph)
- Lowest pressure: 960 hPa (mbar); 28.35 inHg

Category 3-equivalent tropical cyclone
- 1-minute sustained (SSHWS/JTWC)
- Highest winds: 185 km/h (115 mph)
- Lowest pressure: 948 hPa (mbar); 27.99 inHg

Overall effects
- Fatalities: 31 total
- Damage: $1.5 billion (2018 USD)
- Areas affected: Yemen, Oman, Saudi Arabia
- IBTrACS
- Part of the 2018 North Indian Ocean cyclone season

Extremely Severe Cyclonic Storm Mekunu (Note: The name Mekunu (Dhivehi: މެކުނު; [mekunu]) was contributed by the Maldives and means "mullet" in Dhivehi.) was the strongest storm to strike Oman's Dhofar Governorate since 1959. The second named storm of the 2018 North Indian Ocean cyclone season, Mekunu developed out of a low-pressure area on May 21. It gradually intensified, passing east of Socotra on May 23 as a very intense tropical cyclone. On May 25, Mekunu reached its peak intensity. The India Meteorological Department estimated 10 minute sustained winds of 175 km/h (110 mph), making Mekunu an extremely severe cyclonic storm. The American-based Joint Typhoon Warning Center estimated slightly higher 1 minute winds of 185 km/h (115 mph). While at peak intensity, Mekunu made landfall near Raysut, Oman, on May 25. The storm rapidly weakened over land, dissipating on May 27.

While passing near Socotra, Cyclone Mekunu dropped heavy rainfall, causing landslides and flooding that killed 20 people. In the eastern Yemeni mainland, the cyclone caused power outages and flooding, resulting in four fatalities. In Oman, Cyclone Mekunu killed seven people and caused about US$1.5 billion in damage. Rainfall from Mekunu reached 617 mm (24.3 in) in Salalah. The rainfall created desert lakes in the Empty Quarter, or Rub' al Khali, contributing to a locust outbreak that affected 10 countries, including Pakistan where the outbreak led to a state of emergency.

== Meteorological history ==
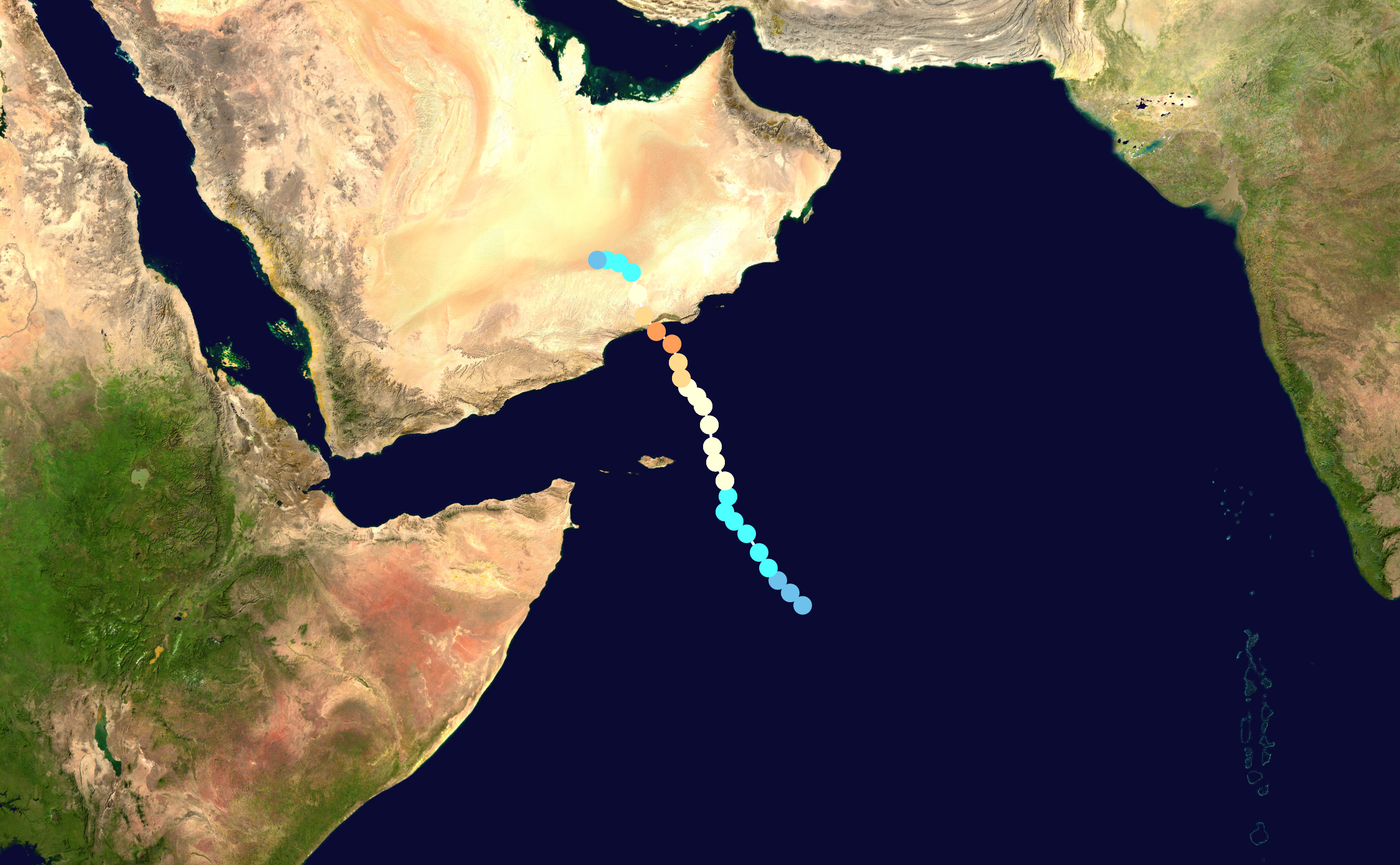
Map plotting the storm's track and intensity, according to the Saffir–Simpson scale Map key Saffir–Simpson scale Tropical depression (≤38 mph, ≤62 km/h) Tropical storm (39–73 mph, 63–118 km/h) Category 1 (74–95 mph, 119–153 km/h) Category 2 (96–110 mph, 154–177 km/h) Category 3 (111–129 mph, 178–208 km/h) Category 4 (130–156 mph, 209–251 km/h) Category 5 (≥157 mph, ≥252 km/h) Unknown Storm type Tropical cyclone Subtropical cyclone Extratropical cyclone, remnant low, tropical disturbance, or monsoon depression

On May 18, an area of convection persisted in the Arabian Sea, northwest of the Maldives, with a broad circulation. With very warm ocean temperatures over 29 °C (84 °F) and moderate wind shear, atmospheric conditions were conducive for eventual tropical cyclone development. At the same time of the disturbance's formation, Cyclone Sagar was located in the Gulf of Aden. On May 20, a distinct low-pressure area developed over the central Arabian Sea. The convection became increasingly organized, aided by good outflow to the north and south. On May 21, the India Meteorological Department (IMD) classified the system as a depression. The American-based Joint Typhoon Warning Center (JTWC) followed suit and began issuing advisories on the system early on May 22, designating it Tropical Cyclone 02A.

Upon its formation, the storm was moving northwestward toward the Arabian Peninsula, steered by a ridge to the northeast. Both the IMD and the JTWC anticipated steady intensification, due to decreasing wind shear. On May 22, the IMD upgraded the depression to a deep depression, and later a cyclonic storm, naming it Mekunu. An eye feature developed in the center of the storm on May 23, indicative of an intensifying storm. That day, the IMD upgraded Mekunu to a Very Severe Cyclonic Storm – the equivalent of a minimal hurricane – while the storm passing east of Socotra. There was uncertainty in predictive storm models around this time whether Mekunu would continue to the northwest, or turn to the northeast, although the storm would continue its northwest trajectory for the remainder of its duration.

On May 24, Mekunu weakened slightly due to a bout of easterly wind shear, causing the eye to become ragged. However, the storm re-intensified, and the thunderstorms organized into a compact area near the center around the eye. The IMD upgraded Mekunu to an extremely severe cyclonic storm on May 25, estimating peak 3-minute sustained winds of 175 km/h (110 mph). On the same day, the JTWC estimated peak winds of 185 km/h (115 mph), equivalent to a Category 3 on the Saffir–Simpson scale. At its peak intensity, Mekunu had a compact 13 km (8 mi) eye, which was visible on satellite imagery. Between 18:30–19:30 UTC on May 25, Mekunu made landfall at peak intensity on southern Oman, near Raysut. It was the first storm of hurricane intensity to strike Dhofar Governorate since 1959. The storm rapidly weakened over the dry, mountainous terrain of western Oman. On May 27, the IMD downgraded Mekunu to a well-marked low-pressure area, near the borders of Oman, Yemen, and Saudi Arabia.

== Preparations and impact ==
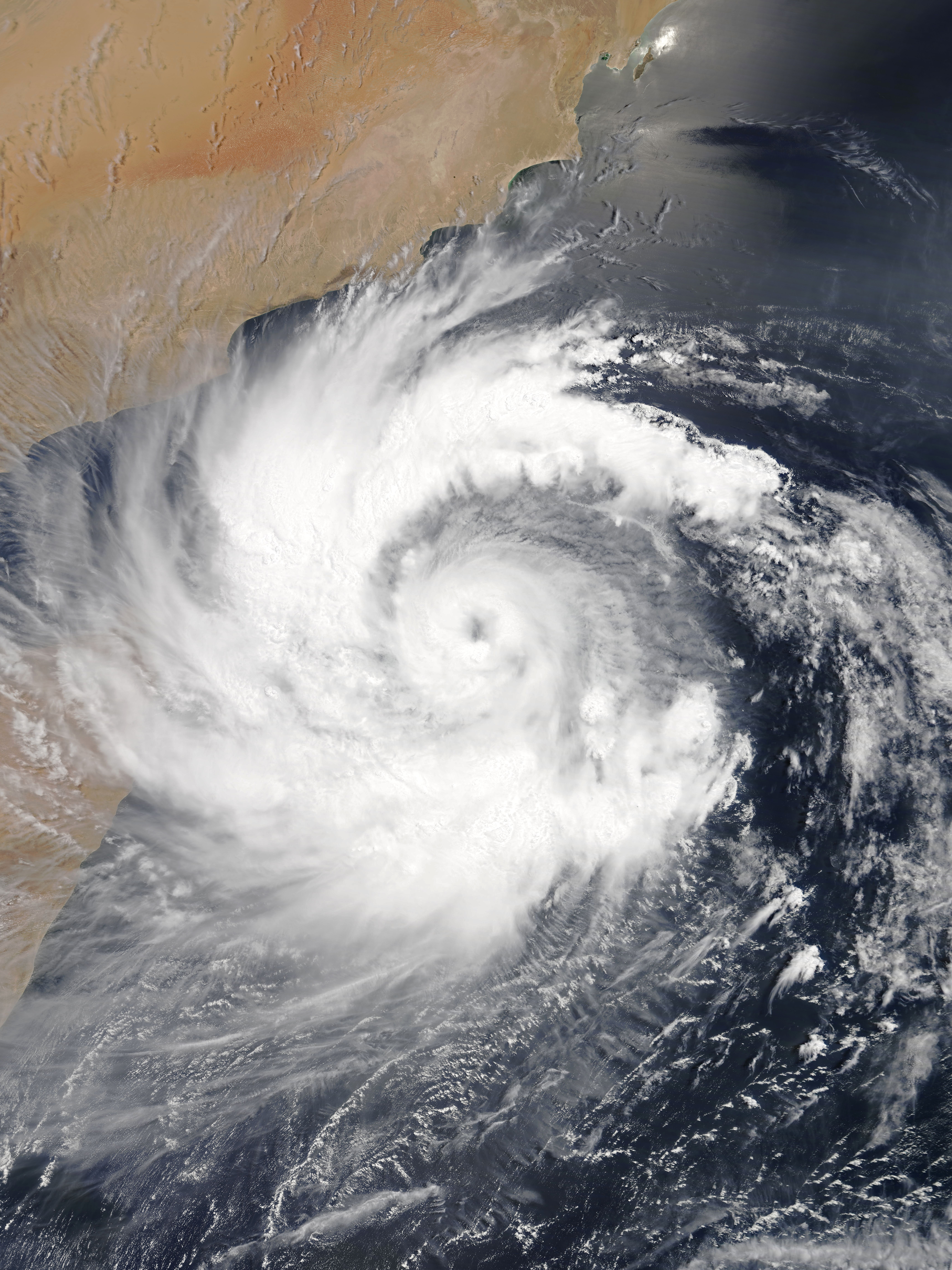
Cyclone Mekunu east of Socotra on May 23

In tracking the storm, the IMD issued a variety of warnings for fishermen and other people in the storm path. Ahead of the storm, Omani officials evacuated hospitals and other areas near the country's border. Salalah Airport was shut down for a period of 24 hours.

Cyclone Mekunu dropped heavy rainfall on Socotra island while passing to its east, causing floods that knocked out most of the island's communications. This spurred the Yemeni government to declare a state of emergency. More than 1,000 households evacuated, utilizing 11 shelters in the island's capital, Hadibu, or otherwise staying with relatives. Flooding washed out the main road connecting Hadibu with Socotra Airport, and roads on the east and west side of the island. Landslides covered farms, destroyed food stocks, knocked down palm trees, and washed away thousands of animals. The storm also damaged water wells, causing interruptions to sewage systems, and leaving residents without clean drinking water. Five cars were destroyed by the floods, and several houses were damaged. The storm capsized 120 fishing boats and wrecked over 500 fishing net. Throughout the island, Mekunu killed at least 20 people.

On the Yemeni mainland, flooding rains damaged roads, vehicles, and buildings in Hadhramaut and Al Mahrah Governorates. The cyclone damaged power lines and generators, causing power outages. In Alaibri, flooding isolated about 2,000 people for about three days. The storm capsized two ships in Al Ghaydah. Across the Yemeni mainland, Mekunu killed four people and injured twenty others.

Cyclone Mekunu struck Oman at peak intensity, bringing strong winds and heavy rainfall. Over a four-day period, the cyclone dropped 617 mm (24.3 in) in Salalah, which is five times the average annual rainfall. During a 24-hour period, the storm dropped 278 mm (10.9 in) of rainfall. The heavy rainfall flooded roads, low-lying areas, and wadis, or dry river beds. The rains collected in area dams, and created lakes in Rub' al Khali, or the Empty Quarter, a large desert that typically receives 30 mm (1.2 in) of annual rainfall. The rains created the first lakes in the desert in nearly 20 years, which was expected to grow vegetation that could feed local camels for two years. Salalah, just east of the landfall location, recorded sustained winds of 96 km/h (60 mph). Dhalkoot, along the coast, recorded wind gusts of 110 km/h (70 mph). Across Oman, particularly near Salalah, Mekunu damaged houses, cars, boats, and other property, resulting in 1,123 insurance claims as of December 31, totalling ﷼155 million (US$403 million). The Aon insurance company estimated US$1.5 billion in damage. Seven people died in Oman, including one who died after being in a coma for nine days.

== Aftermath ==
After the scope of the damage became evident on Socotra, Saudi Arabia, United Arab Emirates (UAE), Qatar, and Kuwait provided shelter, medical, and other emergency supplies. Saudi Arabia sent its first plane of aid on May 27. The UAE also sent helicopters to search for missing people, and airlifted 17 people injured during the storm. The crew from the UAE helped reopen the island's roads. The Qatar Red Crescent Society sent five medical teams, along with emergency supplies. By May 26, Socotra's airport and port were reopened. The United Nations Humanitarian Air Service (UNHAS) carried four flights of food, shelter, and water supplies. On the Yemeni mainland, local Red Cross chapters provided water and food to affected residents. Workers cleared roads to restore access to isolated villages.

The Oman State Council Bureau noted that national unity during the storm helped mitigate storm effects, including cooperation between military, police, information agencies, and volunteers. The General Directorate of Nature Conservation worked with the Dhofar governorate to plant 600 seedlings of Avicennia, to replace the plants washed out during the storm.

The heavy rainfall from Mekunu created favorable breeding conditions for locusts in the Rub' al Khali, or the Empty Quarter. Five months after the storm, Cyclone Luban brought additional rainfall to the region, allowing for more locusts to breed. By February 2019, a locust infestation had spread across the Arabian Peninsula and into Iran, and later into the Horn of Africa, India, and Pakistan, eventually reaching 10 countries. In February 2020, Pakistan declared an emergency due to the locusts threatening food security.

== See also ==
- Weather of 2011
- Tropical cyclones in 2011
- List of Arabian Peninsula tropical cyclones
- Cyclone Gonu (2007)
- Cyclone Phet (2010)
- Cyclone Keila (2011)
- Cyclone Tej (2023)
