= Cyclone Hikaa =

North Indian Ocean tropical cyclone in 2019

Very Severe Cyclonic Storm Hikaa
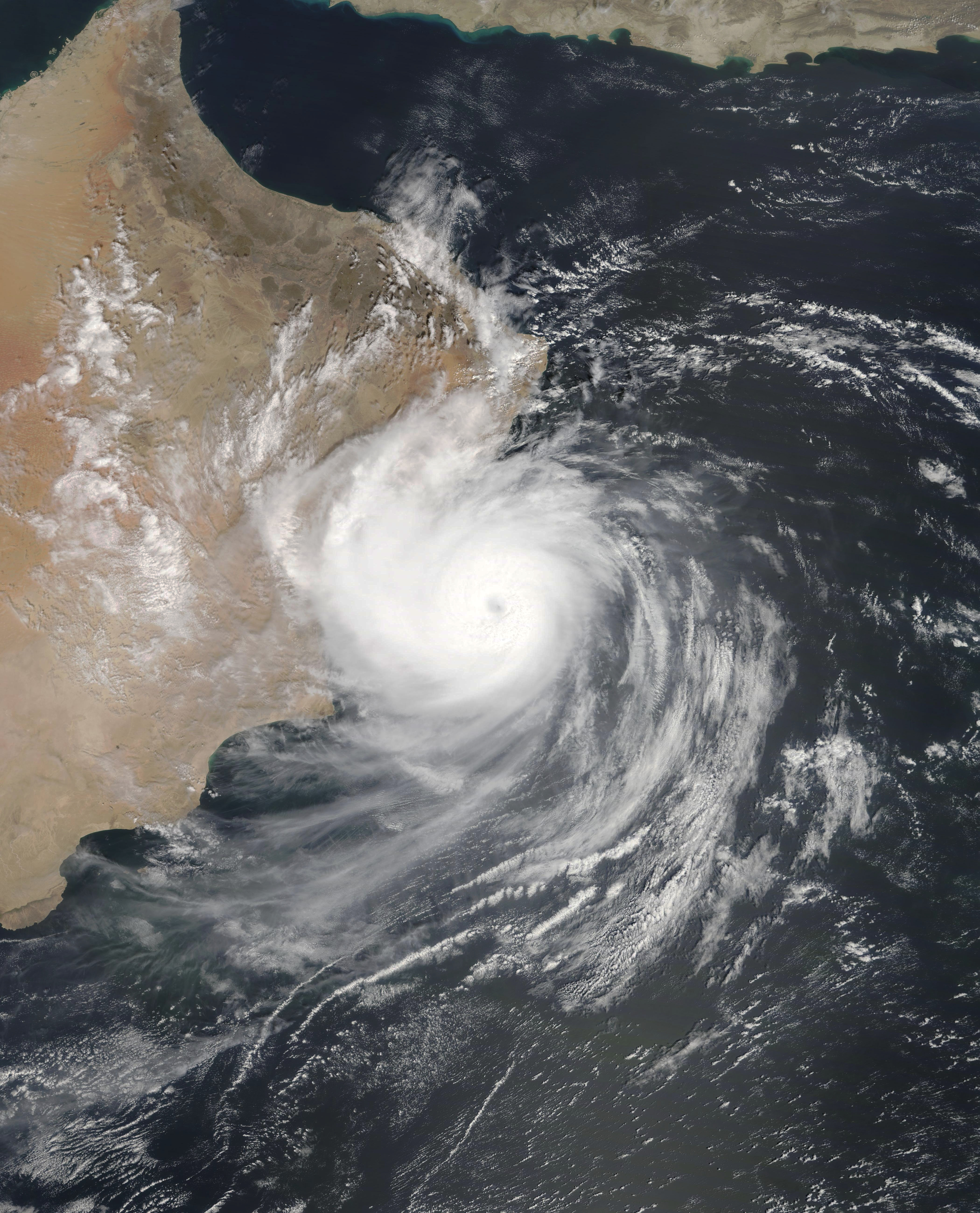
- Cyclone Hikaa on September 24 approaching Oman

Meteorological history
- Formed: September 22, 2019
- Dissipated: September 25, 2019

Very severe cyclonic storm
- 3-minute sustained (IMD)
- Highest winds: 140 km/h (85 mph)
- Lowest pressure: 978 hPa (mbar); 28.88 inHg

Category 2-equivalent tropical cyclone
- 1-minute sustained (SSHWS/JTWC)
- Highest winds: 165 km/h (105 mph)
- Lowest pressure: 969 hPa (mbar); 28.61 inHg

Overall effects
- Fatalities: 5
- Missing: 6
- Damage: >$1 million (2019 USD)
- Areas affected: India, Oman
- IBTrACS
- Part of the 2019 North Indian Ocean cyclone season

Very Severe Cyclonic Storm Hikaa (Note: The name Hikaa (Dhivehi: ހިކާ; [hikaː]) was contributed by the Maldives and means "wrasse" in Dhivehi.) was a tropical cyclone that struck eastern Oman in September 2019. The third named storm of the 2019 North Indian Ocean cyclone season, Hikaa formed on September 22 west of India in the Arabian Sea. The storm reached peak intensity on September 24, with maximum sustained winds estimated over 140 km/h (85 mph). Later that day, the storm made landfall in eastern Oman south of Duqm, and quickly dissipated over the Arabian Peninsula.

== Meteorological history ==
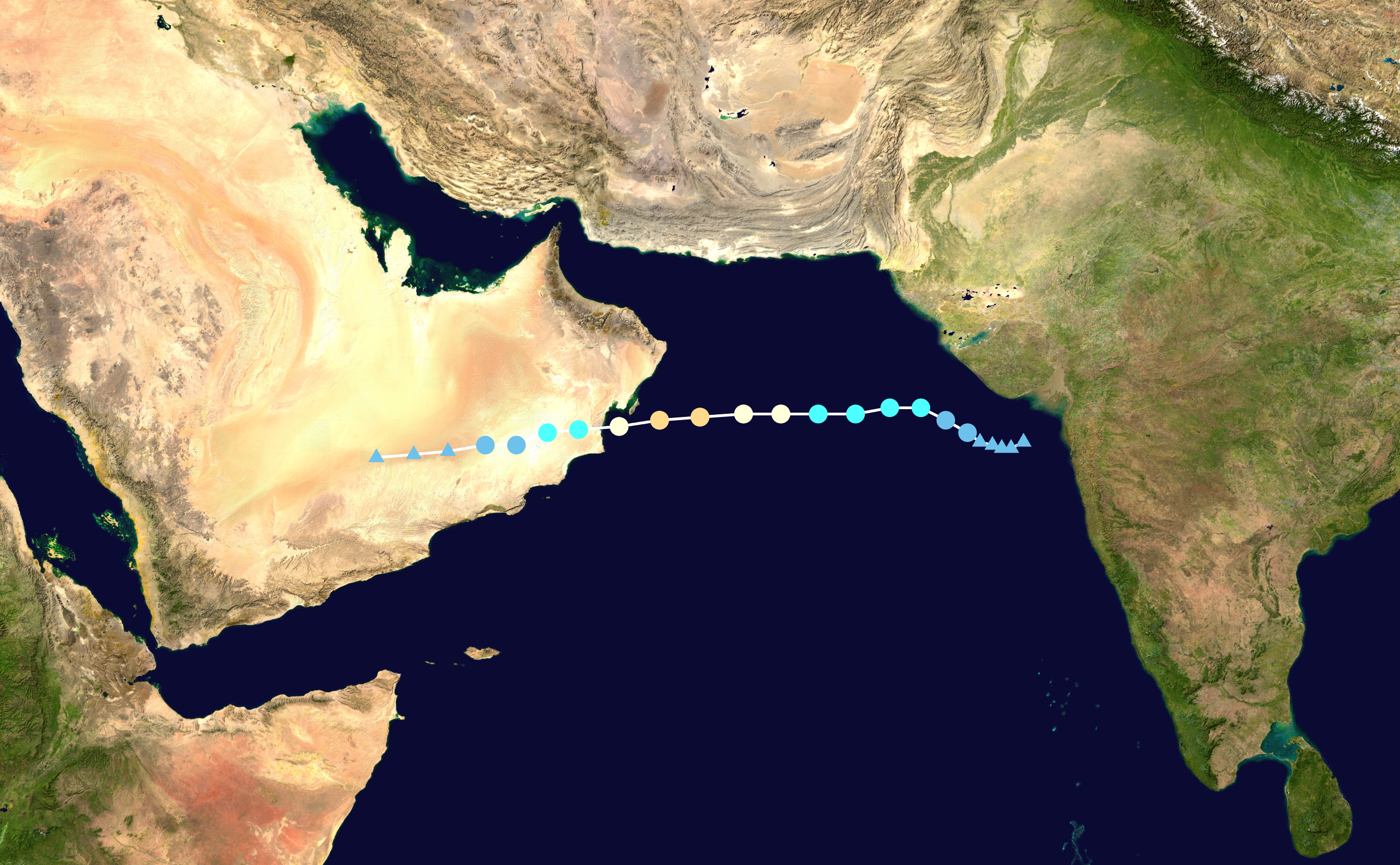
Map plotting the storm's track and intensity, according to the Saffir–Simpson scale Map key Saffir–Simpson scale Tropical depression (≤38 mph, ≤62 km/h) Tropical storm (39–73 mph, 63–118 km/h) Category 1 (74–95 mph, 119–153 km/h) Category 2 (96–110 mph, 154–177 km/h) Category 3 (111–129 mph, 178–208 km/h) Category 4 (130–156 mph, 209–251 km/h) Category 5 (≥157 mph, ≥252 km/h) Unknown Storm type Tropical cyclone Subtropical cyclone Extratropical cyclone, remnant low, tropical disturbance, or monsoon depression

An area of convection, or thunderstorms, persisted along the west coast of India on September 19. A distinct low-pressure area developed a day later off the coast of Maharashtra. By September 21, a circulation was consolidating within the system, located east of the heaviest convection. The system moved slowly westward across the Arabian Sea, steered by a ridge to north. Warm water temperatures favored further development, despite moderate wind shear. Early on September 22, the India Meteorological Department (IMD) designated the system as a depression, and soon upgraded it to a deep depression. Late on September 22, the American-based Joint Typhoon Warning Center (JTWC) initiated advisories on the system, designating it Tropical Cyclone 03A. At the time, the storm had a compact area of thunderstorms, supported by outflow from the south. Due to decreasing wind shear and warm, moist air, the system quickly intensified on September 23, prompting the IMD to upgrade the system to Cyclonic Storm Hikaa; later that day the agency upgraded the storm further to a severe cyclonic storm. During the strengthening phase, an eye feature formed in the center of the convection, indicative of strengthening.

Considering the storm a "midget tropical cyclone", the JTWC upgraded Hikaa to the equivalent of hurricane status late on September 23, while the storm was approaching eastern Oman. The IMD followed suit, upgrading Hikaa to a very severe cyclonic storm on September 24, estimating peak winds of 140 km/h (85 mph). Around the same time, the JTWC estimated peak 1 minute winds of 155 km/h (95 mph), based in part on the 26 km (16 mi) eye in the center of the convection. As Hikaa was nearing land, the eye deteriorated, and the JTWC assessed that the storm weakened. The IMD meanwhile assessed that the cyclone maintained its peak intensity. Around 14:00 UTC on September 24, Hikaa made landfall in eastern Oman just north of Duqm, becoming the first very severe cyclonic storm on record to strike the country in September. Before Hikaa, only two depressions had struck Oman in the month of September, in 1929 and 1979. The storm quickly weakened over land, as dry air and land interaction diminished the convection. Early on September 25, the IMD downgraded Hikaa to a deep depression, and later to a low-pressure area, by which time the storm was near the border of Oman and Saudi Arabia.

== Preparations and impact ==
While Hikaa was first forming, the IMD warned fishermen of the potential of high waves. Officials in Oman advised residents to prepare for the storm and to avoid low-lying areas. In advance of the storm, all schools were closed in Al Wusta and South Sharqiyah governorates. Ferry service to the offshore Masirah Island was canceled. About 750 people evacuated to nine shelters in Al Wusta Governorate, where Hikaa moved ashore.

In Duqm near where Hikaa struck Oman, the airport recorded sustained winds of 96 km/h (60 mph), with gusts to 124 km/h (77 mph). Hikaa dropped heavy rainfall as it struck eastern Oman, reaching 80 mm (3.1 in) in some locations. The storm also produced 3 to 4 m (9.8 to 13.1 ft) waves. A deep-sea fishing boat with a crew of 11 capsized off of Masirah Island during the storm; there were five confirmed fatalities from the shipwreck, and one person was rescued. On the Omani mainland, Hikaa flooded roads and wadis – typically dry riverbeds. In Haima, six people required rescue when they were trapped on a bus in floodwaters. Aon estimated the damage total in the "millions", based on hundreds of properties reporting damage.

== See also ==
- List of Arabian Peninsula tropical cyclones
- 1977 Oman cyclone – deadly tropical storm that took a similar track across the Arabian Sea
