= Cyclone Megh =

North Indian cyclone in 2015

Extremely Severe Cyclonic Storm Megh
- Cyclone Megh shortly before peak intensity while nearing Socotra on November 7

Meteorological history
- Formed: November 5, 2015
- Dissipated: November 10, 2015

Extremely severe cyclonic storm
- 3-minute sustained (IMD)
- Highest winds: 175 km/h (110 mph)
- Lowest pressure: 964 hPa (mbar); 28.47 inHg

Category 3-equivalent tropical cyclone
- 1-minute sustained (SSHWS)
- Highest winds: 205 km/h (125 mph)
- Lowest pressure: 941 hPa (mbar); 27.79 inHg

Overall effects
- Fatalities: 18 total
- Damage: Unknown
- Areas affected: Oman, Somalia, Yemen
- IBTrACS
- Part of the 2015 North Indian Ocean cyclone season

Extremely Severe Cyclonic Storm Megh (Note: The name Megh (Hindi: मेघ; [meːɡʱ]) was contributed by India and means "cloud" in Hindi.) is regarded as the worst tropical cyclone to ever strike the Yemeni island of Socotra, causing additional destruction there after Cyclone Chapala hit the same island. Megh formed on November 5, 2015, in the eastern Arabian Sea, and followed a path similar to Chapala. After moving northward, the cyclone turned to the west, and fueled by warm water temperatures, it quickly intensified. On November 7, the storm developed an eye in the center and began to rapidly intensify into a mature cyclone. By the next day, the India Meteorological Department estimated peak 3 minute sustained winds of 175 km/h (110 mph), and the American-based Joint Typhoon Warning Center estimated 1 minute winds of 205 km/h (125 mph). Shortly thereafter, the cyclone brushed the northern coast of Socotra. The storm steadily weakened thereafter, especially after it skirted the northern Somalia coast. After entering the Gulf of Aden, Megh turned to the west-northwest and struck southwestern Yemen on 10 November as a deep depression, dissipating shortly thereafter.

When Megh passed near Socotra, residents were just beginning to return after the previous cyclone, and many had to evacuate again. Additional heavy rainfall and high winds lashed the island, which destroyed 500 homes and damaged another 3,000. The consecutive storms damaged 785 fishing boats, left 80% of the roads impassible, and caused an island-wide power outage. Megh killed 18 people on Socotra and injured another 60. The heavy damage on the island prompted nearby countries and international organizations to deliver relief goods and medical teams. Later, Megh brought torrential rainfall and high waves to northern Somalia, killing livestock and damaging schools. The storm's final landfall in Yemen marked little rainfall or effects.

== Meteorological history ==
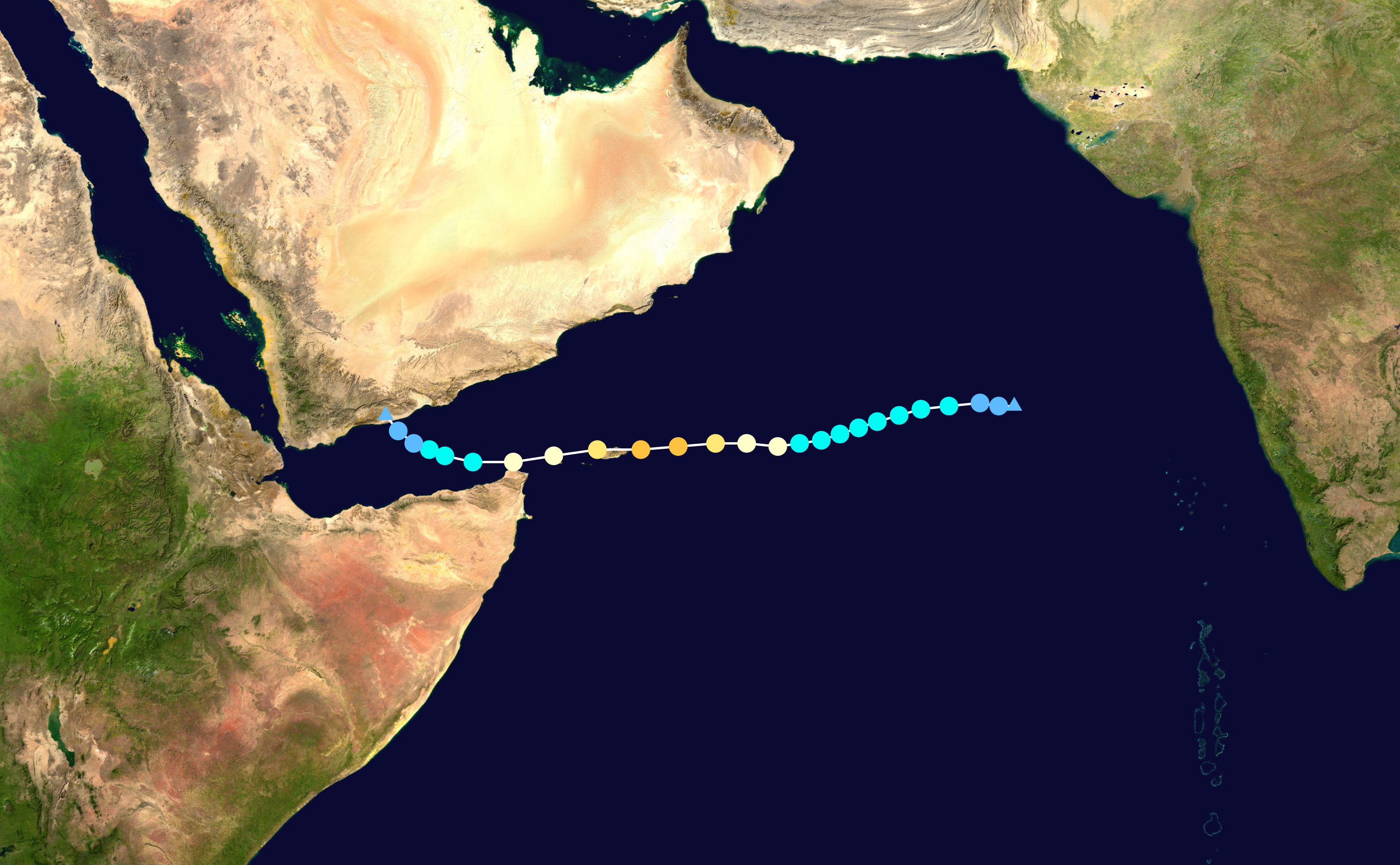
Map plotting the storm's track and intensity, according to the Saffir–Simpson scale Map key Saffir–Simpson scale Tropical depression (≤38 mph, ≤62 km/h) Tropical storm (39–73 mph, 63–118 km/h) Category 1 (74–95 mph, 119–153 km/h) Category 2 (96–110 mph, 154–177 km/h) Category 3 (111–129 mph, 178–208 km/h) Category 4 (130–156 mph, 209–251 km/h) Category 5 (≥157 mph, ≥252 km/h) Unknown Storm type Tropical cyclone Subtropical cyclone Extratropical cyclone, remnant low, tropical disturbance, or monsoon depression

On November 3, an area of scattered convection persisted about 860 km (530 mi) southwest of Mumbai, India, in the central Arabian Sea. The thunderstorms were associated with a weak and broad circulation, located in an area of low wind shear and warm water temperatures over 29 °C (84 °F), both favorable conditions. At the time, the system was located east of Cyclone Chapala, which had recently struck Yemen. On November 4, a distinct low-pressure area developed in association with a mid- to upper-level low, while the region was in an active Madden–Julian oscillation phase favorable for storm development. The circulation became better defined as outflow increased, amplified by an anticyclone over the system. Based on the organization, the India Meteorological Department (IMD) classified the low as a depression at 00:00 UTC on November 5. About six hours later, the IMD upgraded the system to a deep depression, and at 12:00 UTC that day the agency upgraded it to a cyclonic storm, naming it Megh. Earlier that day, the American-based Joint Typhoon Warning Center (JTWC) initiated advisories on the storm as Tropical Cyclone 05A while the storm was about 1,120 km (700 mi) east of Socotra island offshore Yemen.

Upon forming, Megh was moving to the west-southwest due to a ridge to the north. While Megh was in its formative stages, it developed broken rainbands that swirled into the circulation center, which was located beneath the blossoming convection. On November 6, dry air began to become entrained into the circulation, although the unfavorable conditions did not disrupt the center. Instead, the convection became better organized, developing into a central dense overcast, as well as the beginnings of an eye feature. As the storm continued to develop, the radius of maximum winds shrank, resulting in a smaller storm than the previous Cyclone Chapala. At 12:00 UTC on November 7, the JTWC upgraded Megh to the equivalent of a hurricane after a small defined eye became evident. The storm began rapid deepening that day due to the continued low shear and warm water temperatures, and the convection became more symmetric and circular. Such intensification was not anticipated by tropical cyclone forecast models, which emphasized that the external conditions, such as dry air from the west, would be unfavorable. At 06:00 UTC on November 7, the IMD upgraded Megh to a severe cyclonic storm, and just nine hours later upgraded it to a very severe cyclonic storm – the equivalent to hurricane intensity with 3 minute winds of 120 km/h (75 mph).

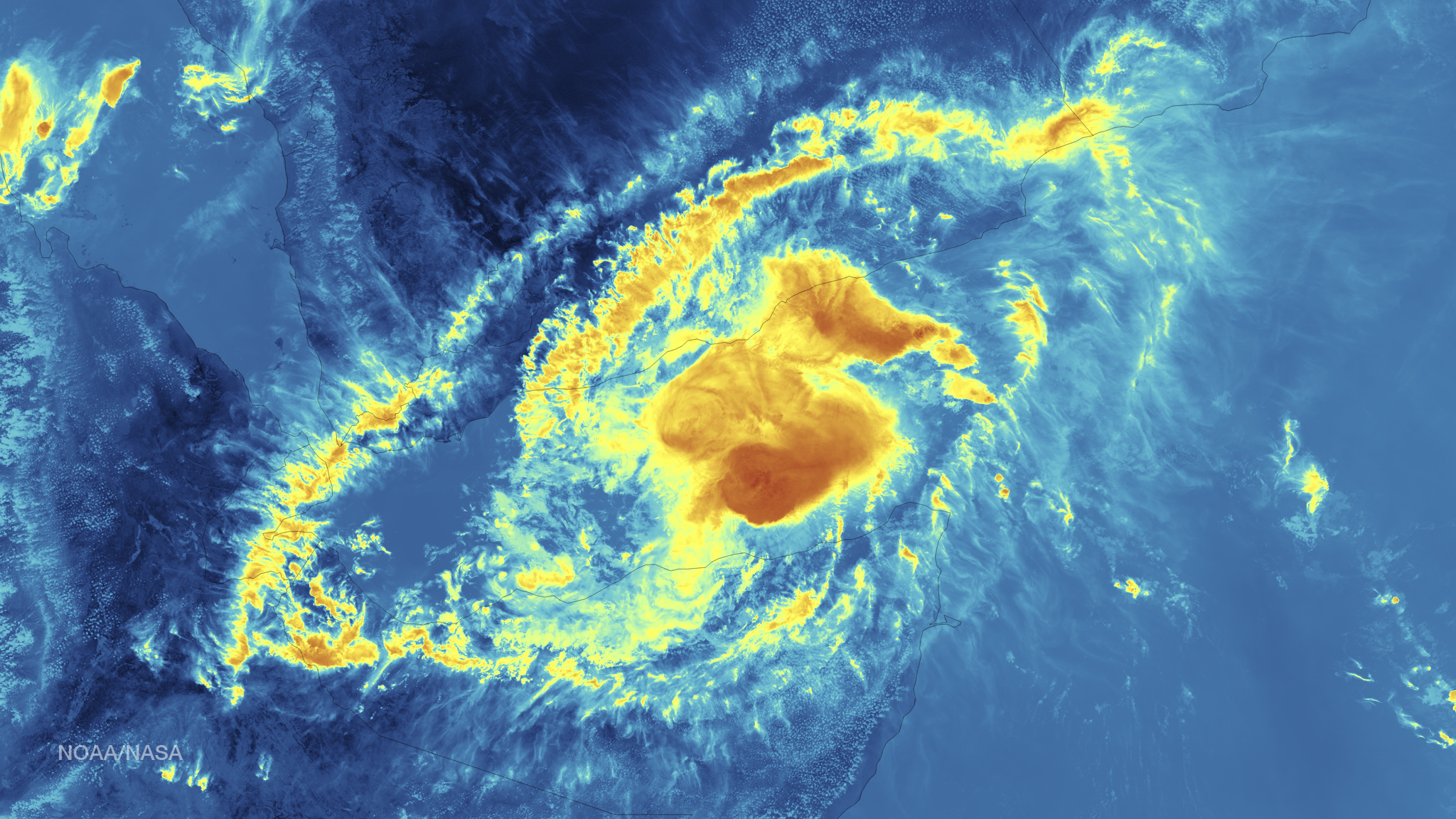
A weakening Cyclone Megh approaching Yemen on November 9

Cyclone Megh continued to rapidly intensify while approaching the island of Socotra. It developed a small eye just 7.4 km (4.6 mi) in diameter by early on November 8, along with a convective core just 280 km (170 mi) in diameter. At 03:00 UTC that day, the IMD upgraded the system to an extremely severe cyclonic storm, and three hours later estimated peak 3 minute winds of 175 km/h (110 mph). At the same time, the JTWC estimated peak 1 minute winds of 205 km/h (125 mph). Since accurate record keeping began in the basin in 1990, this marked the first time in the Arabian Sea that there were two cyclones in one season with 1 minute winds of at least 185 km/h (115 km/h). Between 06:00–12:00 UTC on November 8, the eye of Megh passed just north of Socotra, with the resulting land interaction causing the eyewall to disappear and for the winds to diminish. After exiting the island, the cyclone began weakening further due to cooler water temperatures and drier air from the Arabian Peninsula to the northwest. Early on November 9, the center of Megh passed 57 km (35 mi) north of Cape Guardafui, and further land interaction with Somalia to the south increasingly degraded the storm's structure. At 00:00 UTC that day, Megh weakened into a very severe cyclonic storm.

After passing just north of Somaliland, Megh progressed westward into the Gulf of Aden, the waterway between Somaliland and the Arabian Peninsula. This marked the first time on record when two storms entered the body of water in the same year. By 12:00 UTC on November 9, the center was beginning to become exposed from the convection due to the unfavorable conditions. Throughout the day, the structure rapidly deteriorated as the storm curved to the west-northwest. At 21:00 UTC on November 9, Megh weakened further into a severe cyclonic storm, and degraded further to a cyclonic storm by six hours later. While just offshore Yemen, the circulation slowed and turned to the northeast, after the ridge to the north receded eastward. At 06:00 UTC on November 10 the storm weakened to a deep depression, and three hours later Megh made landfall in southwestern Yemen northeast of Zinjibar, with estimated winds of 55 km/h (35 mph). The structure eroded significantly over land, prompting the JTWC to discontinue advisories. The circulation continued inland, and Megh degenerated into a low-pressure area by 18:00 UTC on November 10.

== Preparations and impact ==
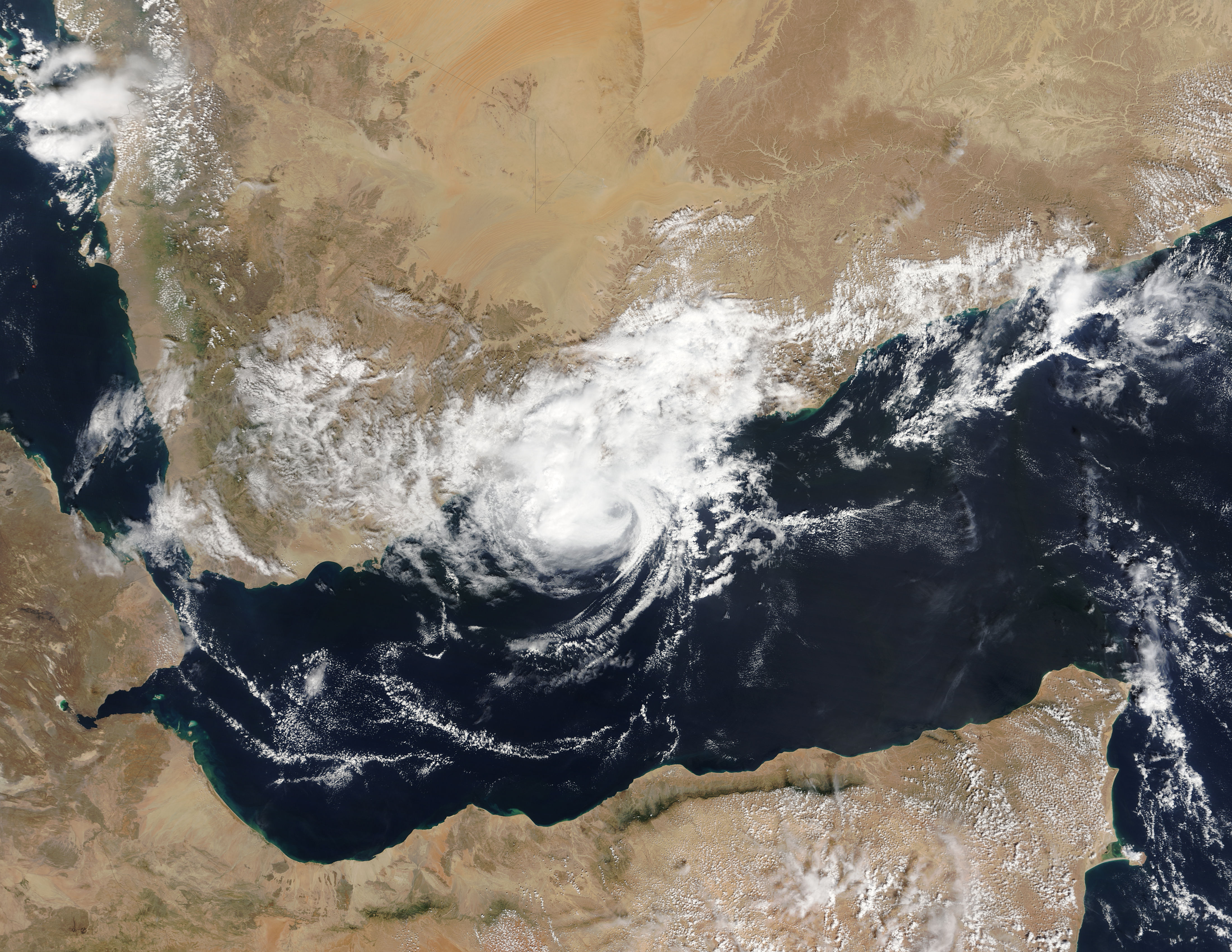
Megh making landfall over Yemen on November 10

Occurring just days after Cyclone Chapala bypassed the island, Cyclone Megh struck Socotra, bringing further winds, rainfall, and flash flooding. Residents who returned home after Chapala had to evacuate again due to Megh, and 800 people on the nearby island of Abd al Kuri evacuated to Hadhramaut Governorate on the Yemeni mainland. Some relief goods delivered after Chapala were damaged during Megh. The cyclone wrecked about 500 homes and damaged 3,000 others, which displaced about 18,000 people to schools and mosques. The storm disrupted entire villages – tainting water wells and affecting communication towers – while also damaging the main hospital and power station. This resulted in fuel shortages and an island wide power outage. The combination of high winds and rainfall caused the island's main port to close, with 785 fishing boats and 1,130 fishing nets damaged by Chapala and Megh. About 80% of the roads on Socotra were left impassible. The storm also killed many livestock and downed thousands of palm trees. Two people died on Socotra when their homes collapsed. Overall, the storm killed 18 people on the island and injured 60 others.

After the storm, communication disruptions on Socotra made it difficult for relief workers to determine the needs of the affected residents. Due to the main port being damaged, residents built a makeshift pathway to assist relief distribution from a ship carrying 700 tons of supplies from the United Arab Emirates. Relief distribution was also disrupted by the heavy damage to Socotra's infrastructure, including damaged roads and minimal power or fuel supply. After the storm, displaced residents stayed in public buildings or outside damaged houses. Due to the collective impacts of Chapala and Megh, various Persian Gulf countries sent 43 planes with supplies to the island by 19 November. The United Arab Emirates sent a ship and a plane, carrying 500 tons of food, 10 tons of blankets and tents, and 1,200 barrels of food. The local Red Cross gave cooked meals and tarps to the island's residents. The International Organization for Migration provided 2,000 shelter kits as well as a medical team to Socotra.

While brushing the northern tip of Somalia, Megh dropped heavy rainfall to coastal regions of the nation, particularly in the Puntland region. There, stations recorded more than 300% of the average annual rainfall. Eyl reported 160 mm (6.3 in) of rainfall over 24 hours. Megh also lashed the coast with strong waves, and the combination with rainfall damaged several boats. The rains led to flash flooding that blocked roads. Megh damaged schools, police stations, and the main hospital in Alula District. The passage of Megh also resulted in the loss of livestock in the region, and many fruit and palm trees were knocked down. After the passages of earlier Cyclone Chapala and Megh, the local Red Cross chapter distributed blankets, sleeping mats, and mattresses to the affected families.

By the time Megh made landfall on the Yemen mainland, it had weakened enough to not produce any strong winds or heavy rainfall.

== See also ==
- Other tropical cyclones in:

- Horn of Africa
- Arabian Peninsula

- 2008 Yemen cyclone
- Cyclone Chapala (2015)
- Cyclone Ockhi (2017), another Category 3 tropical cyclone in the Arabian Sea.
