= Deep Depression ARB 02 (2008) =

North Indian cyclone in 2008

Deep Depression ARB 02 2008 Yemen cyclone
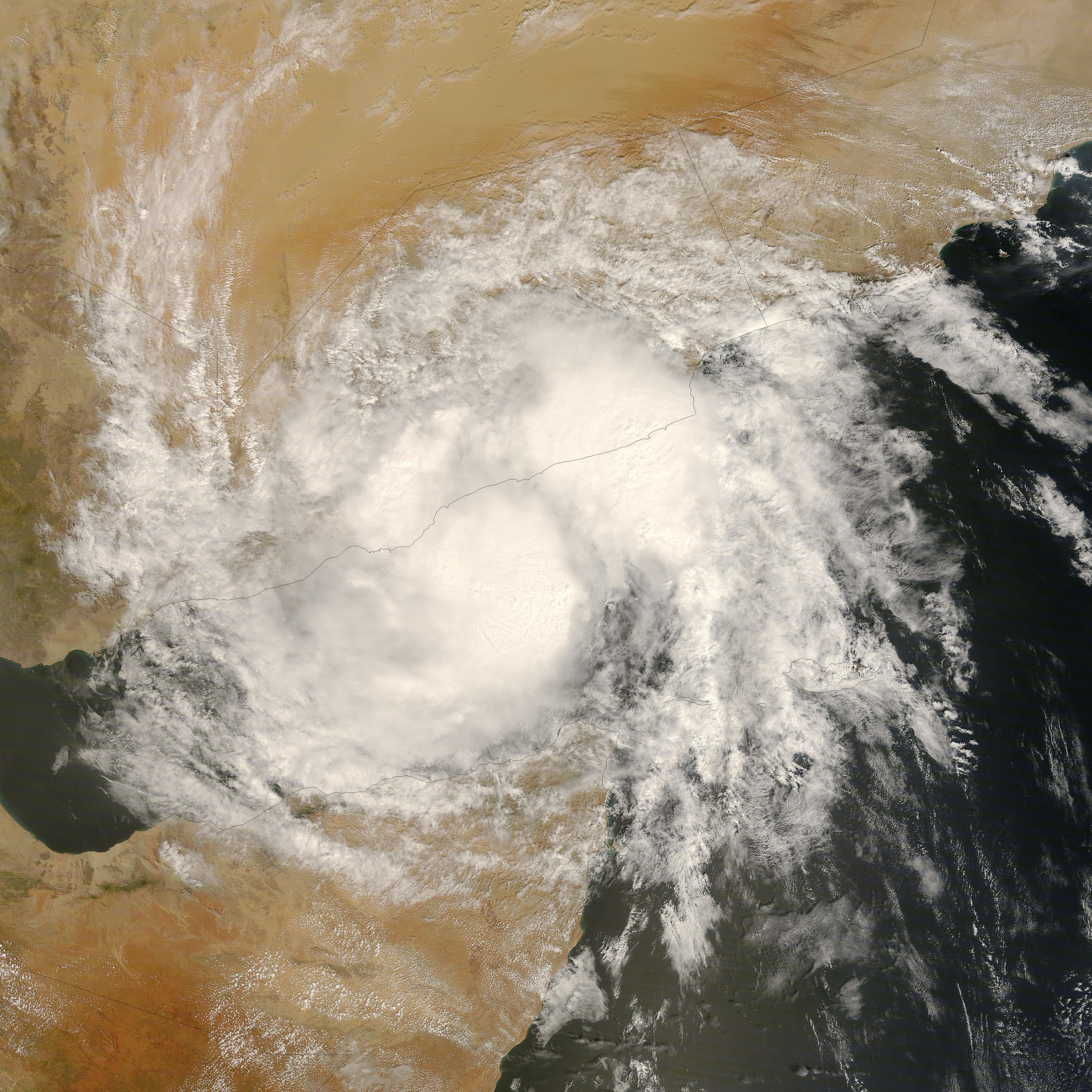
- Deep Depression ARB 02

Meteorological history
- Formed: 19 October 2008
- Dissipated: 23 October 2008

Deep depression
- 3-minute sustained (IMD)
- Highest winds: 55 km/h (35 mph)
- Lowest pressure: 1000 hPa (mbar); 29.53 inHg

Tropical depression
- 1-minute sustained (SSHWS/JTWC)
- Highest winds: 55 km/h (35 mph)
- Lowest pressure: 1000 hPa (mbar); 29.53 inHg

Overall effects
- Fatalities: 180
- Damage: $1.64 billion (2008 USD)
- Areas affected: Yemen, Somalia
- Part of the 2008 North Indian Ocean cyclone season

Deep Depression ARB 02 was a weak yet costly tropical cyclone which caused extensive damage and loss of life in Yemen. The sixth tropical cyclone and third deep depression of the 2008 North Indian Ocean cyclone season, ARB 02 formed in the Arabian Sea on October 19 from the same broader system which would spawn Moderate Tropical Storm Asma in the southern Indian Ocean around that time. Moving generally westward, the depression failed to intensify further, reaching maximum sustained winds of 55 km/h (35 mph). It would weaken, becoming a remnant low on October 23. Later that day, the system's remnants would make landfall near Ash Shihr in eastern Yemen.

The storm sent a plume of moisture throughout the Arabian Peninsula, contributing to dust storms as far north as Iraq. However, the effects were most severe in Yemen, becoming the second-worst natural disaster in the country after deadly floods in 1996. The storm dropped heavy rainfall in a normally arid region, reaching around 91 mm (3.6 in), which caused flash flooding in valleys after waterways were unable to contain the approximately 2 billion m^{3} (528 billion gallons) of water that fell. Poor drainage practices and an invasive species of weed contributed to the floods, which damaged or destroyed 6,505 houses, leaving about 25,000 people homeless. The floods killed 180 people and severely disrupted the livelihoods of about 700,000 residents of Hadhramaut and Al Mahrah governorates, mostly farmers whose fields were washed away. Some of the buildings at the Shibam UNESCO World Heritage Site collapsed due to the floods. Overall damage was estimated at US$874.8 million, although residual losses from damaged infrastructure were estimated to cost an additional US$726.9 million. The overall economic impact of the storm was therefore estimated at US$1.638 billion, equating to roughly 6% of the country's gross domestic product.

After the scale of the damage became clear, the government of Yemen requested for assistance from the international community. The hardest hit areas had poor infrastructure, which caused difficulties in communications as relief goods were distributed. Nations in the region, including Saudi Arabia and the United Arab Emirates, sent money and supplies to help rebuild the damaged infrastructure and houses. Agencies under the United Nations provided food and logistical support. Relief efforts continued to make progress until 2011 due to a political uprising in Yemen.

== Meteorological history ==
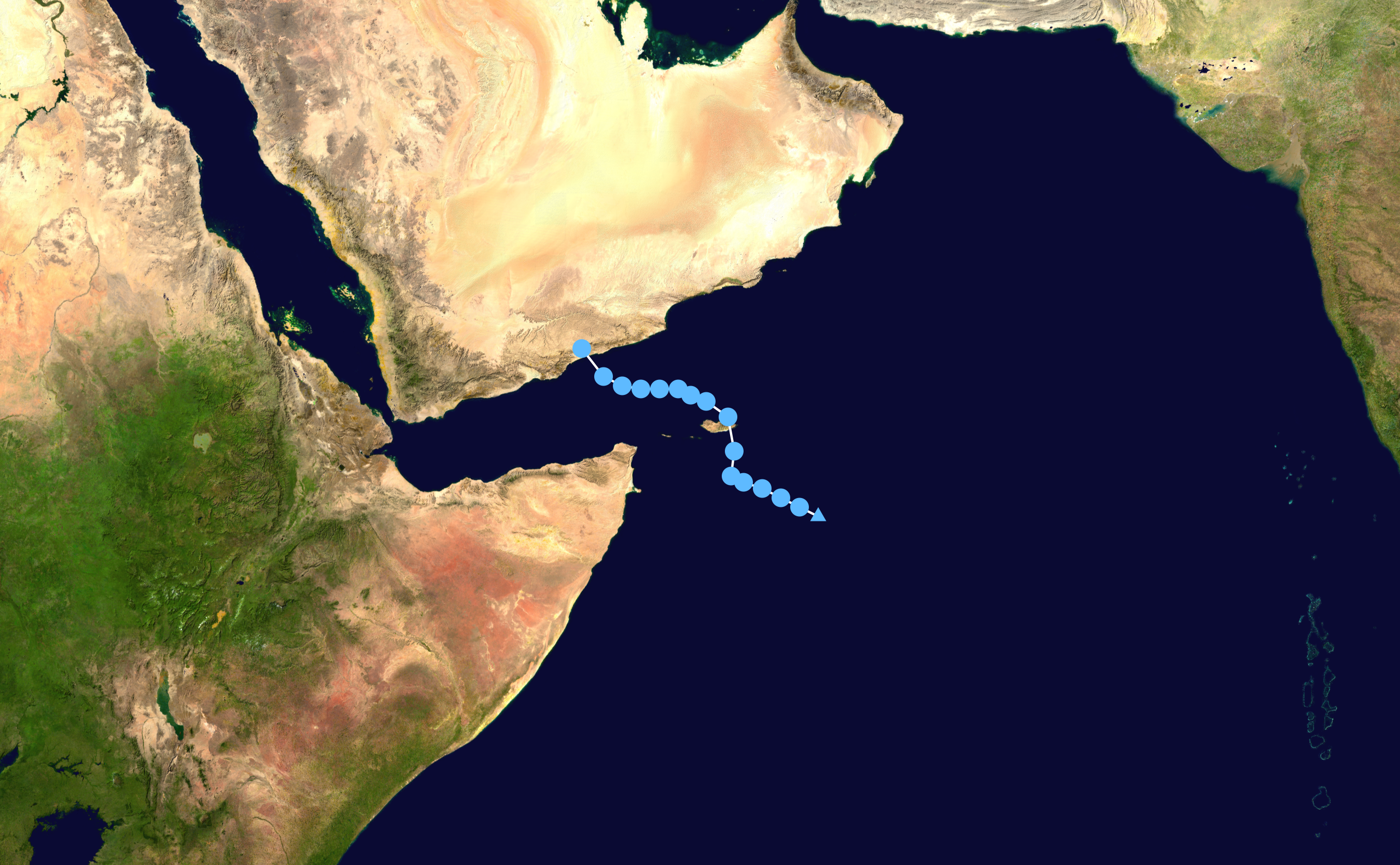
Map plotting the storm's track and intensity, according to the Saffir–Simpson scale Map key Saffir–Simpson scale Tropical depression (≤38 mph, ≤62 km/h) Tropical storm (39–73 mph, 63–118 km/h) Category 1 (74–95 mph, 119–153 km/h) Category 2 (96–110 mph, 154–177 km/h) Category 3 (111–129 mph, 178–208 km/h) Category 4 (130–156 mph, 209–251 km/h) Category 5 (≥157 mph, ≥252 km/h) Unknown Storm type Tropical cyclone Subtropical cyclone Extratropical cyclone, remnant low, tropical disturbance, or monsoon depression

On October 11, an active phase of the Madden–Julian oscillation, in conjunction with an equatorial wind burst, produced twin areas of convection in the central Indian Ocean on both sides of the equator. The system in the southern hemisphere would become Tropical Storm Asma in the south-west Indian Ocean, and the system in the northern hemisphere would ultimately strike Yemen. The northern hemisphere system originated in the Bay of Bengal, and moved westward for much of its duration, steered by a ridge to the north along 15º N. On October 16, a low-pressure area developed over southern India near Kanyakumari. With low wind shear and warm waters of 27 to 28 °C (81 to 82 °F), the system slowly organized. On October 19, the India Meteorological Department (IMD) classified the low as a depression about 725 km (450 mi) southeast of the Yemeni island of Socotra. By that time, the convection had organized more, although it was displaced slightly from the center due to stronger wind shear.

The convection persisted along the western periphery of an elongated center, organizing enough for the American-based Joint Typhoon Warning Center (JTWC) to issue warnings on the depression on October 20, designating it Tropical Cyclone 03A. With marginally favorable conditions, the depression intensified slightly, and the IMD upgraded it to a 55 km/h (35 mph) deep depression on October 21, the same peak as the JTWC. That day, the system moved over Socotra as it reached an area of cooler water temperatures. Land interaction and dry air weakened the convection around the system as it approached the Gulf of Aden. The IMD downgraded the cyclone to depression status on October 22. On the next day, the JTWC discontinued advisories, and the IMD downgraded the system further to a remnant low to the northeast of Cape Guardafui, Somalia. The JTWC continued tracking the system as it moved northwestward, and the circulation made landfall near Ash Shihr in southeastern Yemen late on October 23, losing its identity shortly thereafter.

== Impact ==
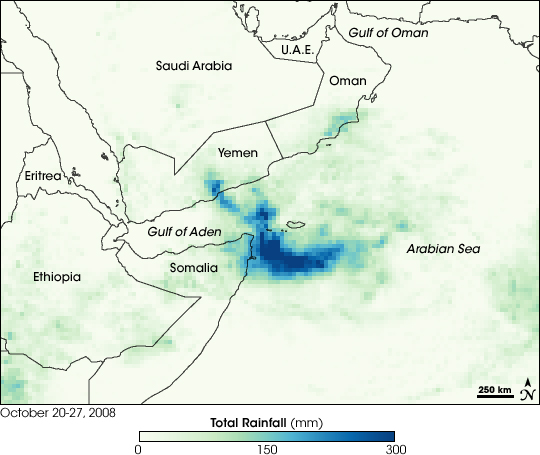
Estimated rainfall from the storm

Moving ashore southeastern Yemen, the storm dropped heavy rainfall in the typically arid region, reaching 91 mm (3.6 in) in some areas, and possibly as high as 200 mm (8 in), over a 20,000 km^{2} (7,700 mi^{2}) area. This equated to about 2 billion m^{3} (528 billion gallons) of water, more than twice the capacity of most waterways. The thunderstorms and rainfall occurred over a 30‑hour period, severely disrupting life in eastern Yemen. The precipitation coalesced into valleys, resulting in flash flooding that swelled water levels to 18 m (59 ft). Hundreds of residents became trapped in their homes, while businesses and schools were shut down. The storm sent a plume of moisture that spread into Saudi Arabia, reaching 74 mm (2.9 in) in Najran, and was drawn northward into Iraq by a trough over Syria, triggering dust storms.

A representative of UNICEF estimated that the magnitude of the flooding was the worst in 600 years, attributing the scope to climate change. The areas effected – primarily Hadhramaut and Al Mahrah governorates – are usually dry and unsuited for such flooding. This resulted in the second worst natural disaster on record in Yemen, following deadly floods in 1996. Overall, the floods killed around 180 people in Yemen, with many corpses carried away by the deluge. Illegal alterations in canal and drainage systems caused the floods to impact many houses and buildings, and the governor of Hadhramaut credited the invasive Prosopis juliflora weed as exasperating floods after blocking waterways. Throughout the country, the floods destroyed 2,826 houses and damaged another 3,679, leaving about 25,000 people homeless; many of these houses were made of mud, washed away by the floodwaters. The displaced utilized temporary shelters in mosques and schools, or stayed with family and friends. Damage to housing, hospitals, and education was estimated at $200 million. The UNESCO World Heritage Site at Shibam – dating back to the 3rd century and housing tall mud buildings from the 17th century – was surrounded by floodwaters, causing some of the dwellings to collapse. Businesses and other infrastructure projects were also destroyed.

Infrastructure damage was estimated at $113 million (2008 USD), most of which related to damaged roads, after thoroughfares were washed away. At the Sayun Airport, floods damaged runways and other facilities. 359 dams were damaged, alongside 65 reservoirs. Widespread irrigation systems were also damaged, including 117,875 m (386,729 ft) of pipelines, 1,241 wells, and 1,229 water pumps. Electricity and telephone lines were disrupted in the region. The floods damaged 170 schools, as well as many health facilities. Along the coast, the storm damaged many fishing boats and equipment. In Al Mahrah Governorate, the storm washed a cargo ship ashore, although the 17 person crew was rescued.

The Hadhramaut Governorate was the worst affected

Agriculture impacts were significant, estimated at $550 million, which affected 75% of the farmers in Hadhramaut. Soil erosion from the floods damaged 22,902 acres (9,268 ha) of farmlands, as well as 51,455 acres (20,823 ha) of uncultivated lands. This mostly affected cereals, vegetables, and forage crops. Floods killed about 58,500 livestock and wrecked 309,103 beehives. The storm also knocked down 547,185 palm trees, 16,587 citrus trees, and another 161,449 fruit trees. Despite the heavy agriculture damage, the floods did not disrupt the national food supply.

The effects of the flooding disrupted the livelihoods of about 700,000 residents; most of the storm's damage affected people's jobs, including farming, industry, and commerce, totaling $557.3 million in damages. About 76% of the overall effects of the flooding were the result of disruption of people's jobs. Overall damage was estimated at $874.8 million, although residual losses from damaged infrastructure were estimated to cost an additional $726.9 million. The overall economic impact of the storm was therefore estimated at $1.638 billion, equating to roughly 6% of the country's gross domestic product. Damage was heaviest in Hadhramaut Governorate, accounting for 67.5% of the material damages, and occurred mostly along the coast; 16 of the 19 districts in the governorate reported damage. Also in Hadramaut, there were 57 people injured due to the storm. The government sent search and rescue teams into the flooded areas to help stranded residents, although strong winds in the region disrupted these efforts in the immediate aftermath. In Seiyun, six soldiers died while attempting to rescue trapped residents. Lightning strikes killed six people.

== Aftermath ==
"The damages... are great and the catastrophe is also great."

— Then-Yemeni president Ali Abdullah Saleh

On October 27, the Yemen government requested assistance from the international community, unable to provide disaster assessments or cope with the rebuilding. The storm affected areas of Yemen that already had poor infrastructure and lack of food, and were generally under a state of political unrest, which made recovery difficult. In some areas, relief distribution was duplicated due to lack of coordination while some areas did not receive help. Yemen's Deputy Prime Minister for Internal Affairs coordinated the relief efforts, in conjunction with the governors of the most affected areas. The government focused on streamlining disaster activities and toward future mitigation. However, there was no coordinated disaster plan as of September 2009, and the scale of the disaster proved too great for ministries to handle. The Ministry of Public Works helped reopen roads, which allowed for the transport of relief goods, and the damaged Sayun Airport was repaired to withstand future floods. By December 2008, most roads, power systems, hospitals, and communication services were restored. The government also enacted the Fund for Hadramout and Al-Mahara Reconstruction, which failed to promptly distribute aid assistance.

In addition to requesting international aid, the Yemen government declared Hadhramaut and Al Mahrah governorates as disaster areas, after then-president Ali Abdullah Saleh surveyed the affected areas. The president also utilized the nation's military to assist storm victims, and sent aircraft with tents, food, and medicine to the worst hit areas. To raise money for the disaster recovery, the Yemeni government cut one day of salary for all workers, equating to $4.25 million, and the government provided another $100 million from its annual budget. Local charities and residents collectively raised $8.5 million. Yemen's Red Cross provided meals and water to about 21,000 people. The agency also provided school kits for 4,500 students whose facilities were damaged. Ultimately, the Red Cross assisted over 70,000 storm victims through health programs, and also helped residents cope with stress, hygiene promotion, and other ongoing vulnerabilities to their livelihoods.

Various agencies under the United Nations assisted in the recovery; the World Health Organization provided medical kits to the worst hit areas, capable of helping 10,000 residents each for three months. The United Nations Development Programme helped house displaced storm victims, and many of the mud-built houses were repaired with the same construction materials as before. The World Bank led the assessment efforts, estimating the cost of recovery at $1.046 billion, mostly toward rebuilding houses, regrowing crops, and restoring social services. The World Bank also provided $41 million toward the Yemen Flood Protection and Emergency Reconstruction, which rebuilt vital infrastructure and ensured they were flood-proof. The World Food Programme assisted 43,000 people with food and other emergency supplies. The Organisation of the Islamic Conference declared the situation a "national catastrophe" and started a drive to collect funds for the relief of flood victims. At an international donor conference, various individuals and countries pledged $301 million to help with the reconstruction in the country. Arab nations in the region also donated cash and supplies to Yemen; Saudi Arabia pledged $100 million in assistance. The United Arab Emirates Red Crescent assisted in the reconstruction work, sending $27.3 million to rebuild 1,000 houses; 750 of these were completed by December 2009. The Arab Fund sent $135 million, including $35 million for road reconstruction. The Japanese government provided funding toward building shelter for 700 displaced Al-Akhdam people, designed to be away from the flood plain. Access to clean drinking water and proper shelter for the displaced helped mitigate the spread of disease. For many families, the effects of the disaster lasted several years due to insufficient assistance or disrupted jobs. By 2010, about 40% of the overall recovery cost was met by international donations, although funding was halted after political uprising in 2011.

Over the long term, residents lost significant amounts of income in the storm-affected areas, particularly farms in the year after the storm. Higher food prices also resulted in less income for other residents. The area's economy largely recovered to pre-flood levels by 2010.

== See also ==
- List of Arabian Peninsula tropical cyclones
- 1996 Oman cyclone – deadly tropical storm that became the costliest disaster on record in Yemen
- 2002 Oman cyclone – another storm that struck the Arabian Peninsula originating alongside a storm in the southern hemisphere
- Cyclone Keila – slow-moving storm in 2011 that caused flooding in Oman and Yemen
- Cyclone Chapala – Another powerful storm that made landfall in Yemen in 2015
- Cyclone Megh – A storm that impacted Yemen soon after Cyclone Chapala
