= List of Arabian Peninsula tropical cyclones =

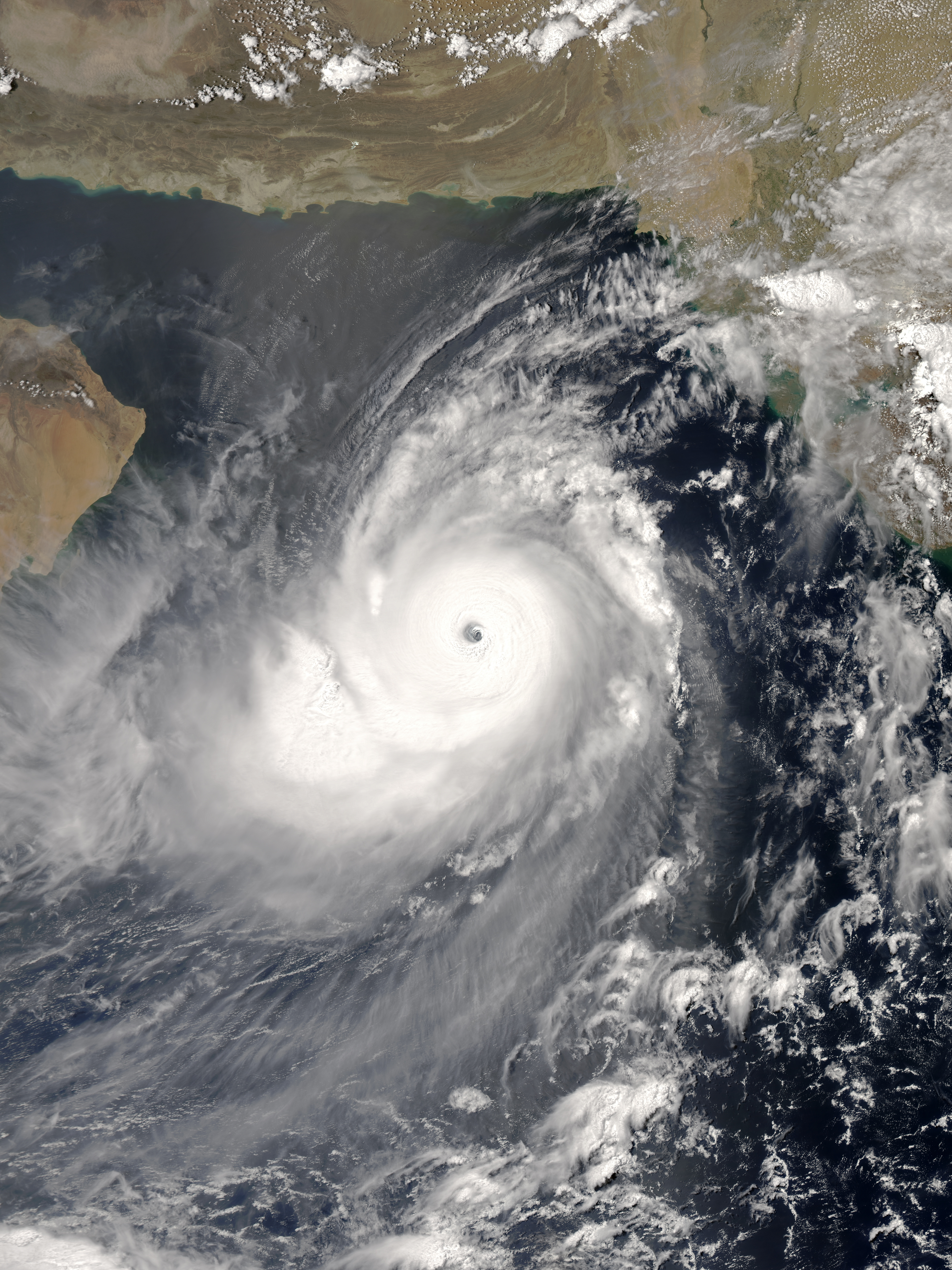
Satellite image of Cyclone Gonu in the Arabian Sea approaching the coast of Oman

The Arabian Peninsula is a peninsula between the Red Sea, the Arabian Sea, and the Persian Gulf. There are 64 known tropical cyclones that affected the peninsula, primarily Yemen and Oman. For convenience, storms are included that affected the Yemeni island of Socotra. Most of the tropical cyclones originated in the Arabian Sea, the portion of the Indian Ocean north of the equator and west of India. The remainder formed in the Bay of Bengal off India's east coast. Collectively, the 64 storms have caused at least US$8.3 billion in damage and 1,693 deaths. The most damaging cyclone was Cyclone Gonu, which caused US$4 billion in damage and 50 fatalities when it struck Oman in 2007. Tropical cyclone damage in the Arabian Peninsula is chiefly due to flooding.

== Climatology ==
Within the Indian Ocean north of the equator, tropical cyclones are tracked by the India Meteorological Department (IMD), which is the officially designated Regional Specialized Meteorological Center for the region. The American-based Joint Typhoon Warning Center (JTWC) also tracks storms in the basin on an unofficial basis. The Arabian Sea, which borders the Arabian Peninsula, typically spawns tropical cyclones in the southeastern portion of the body of water, offshore of western India. About 48.5% of cyclones dissipate without making landfall, or moving ashore, and around one in three storms move toward the Arabian Peninsula. However, storms do not form in the western Arabian Sea because of cool sea surface temperatures (the result of strong winds from the monsoon), as well as dry air from the Arabian Peninsula.

== Impacts by country ==
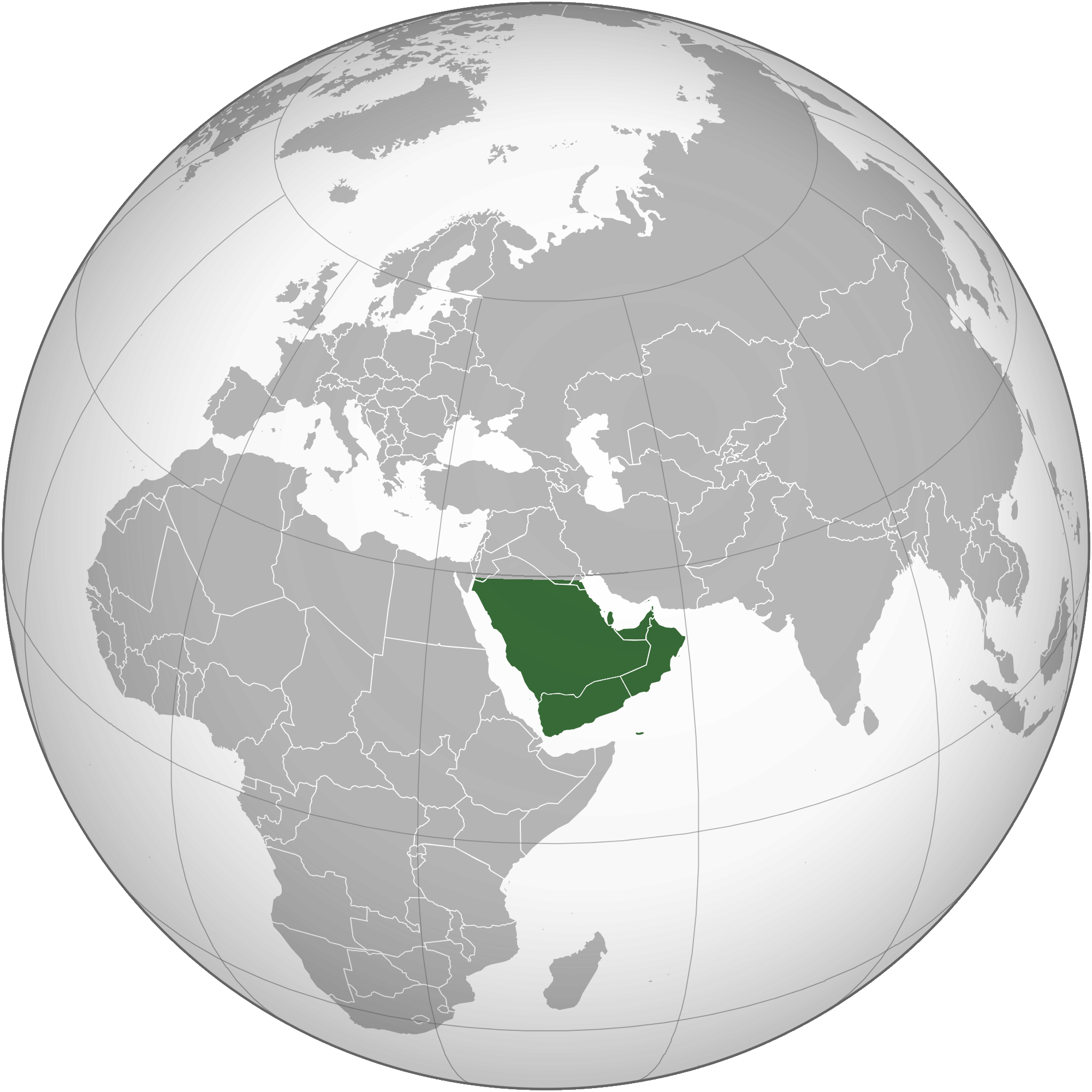
Map of the Arabian Peninsula (highlighted in green)

The sultanate of Oman, located on the southeastern corner of the Arabian Peninsula, regularly receives the impacts of tropical cyclones due to its long coastline along the Arabian Sea. On average, storms strike Oman once every three years, mostly between Masirah Island and Salalah, and usually before the June or after October. From 1943 to 1967, tropical cyclones accounted for about 25% of Salalah's overall rainfall. About once every five years, a storm affects the Dhofar region of southern Oman. In addition, storm intensities at landfall have only been accurately known since around 1979, and reliable record keeping began around 1970. In 2014, an archaeology team discovered evidence that a major flood affected Ras Al Hadd in eastern Oman, possibly the result of a tsunami or a severe storm.

Oman's most damaging storm was Cyclone Gonu in 2007, which was the strongest recorded storm in the Arabian Sea and the strongest to make landfall on the landmass. Gonu left US$4 billion in damage and killed 50 people, making it the worst natural disaster on record in Oman. In 2010, a slightly weaker cyclone named Phet caused US$780 million in damage and 24 deaths while crossing eastern Oman. Cyclonic Storm Keila in the subsequent year killed 19 people while looping near Oman's southern coastline, and left US$80 million in damage. In 1890, a storm killed 757 people when it flooded much of Oman's capital. A storm in 1959 caused a shipwreck near southern Oman, resulting in the loss of all 141 crewmembers. Another storm-related shipwreck killed 18 people in December 1998. In June 1977, a storm struck Masirah Island, causing 105 deaths and becoming Oman's worst natural disaster in the 20th century. A storm in 2002 that killed nine and caused US$25 million in damage. Cyclone Nilofar in 2014 killed four people from its outer rainbands.

Although storms rarely strike Yemen, back-to-back cyclones Chapala and Megh hit the country one week apart in November 2015. The country has two recorded landfalls by severe cyclonic storms – tropical cyclones with winds of at least 89 km/h (55 mph). The first was a storm in May 1960, and the other was Cyclone Chapala in 2015, the latter being the second-strongest cyclone on record in the Arabian Sea. Chapala earlier struck the Yemeni offshore island of Socotra, which was also hit by Cyclone Megh less than a week later. The two storms collectively killed 26 people in Yemen. The country's worst natural disaster on record was from a 1996 storm that earlier hit Oman, causing severe flooding that caused US$1.2 billion in damage and 338 deaths. The second worst natural disaster in Yemen was from a weak depression in 2008 that killed 180 people and caused US$874.8 million in damage. More recently, Cyclone Sagar killed a woman when her house caught fire due to the storm.

Elsewhere on the peninsula, Cyclone Gonu's waves damaged the port in Fujairah, United Arab Emirates. In 1995 and again in 1996, the remnants of a storm that hit Oman entered Rub' al Khali, or the Empty Quarter, of Saudi Arabia. In 2008, the remnants of a storm that hit Yemen brought rainfall and dust storms to Saudi Arabia and Iraq.

== List of storms ==
=== Pre-1900 ===
- June 2, 1881 – A storm crossed Masirah Island and dissipated over southeastern Oman.
- June 1, 1885 – A cyclone was moving westward through the Gulf of Aden passed just north of the Yemeni island of Socotra with rough seas and high winds. The storm later affected a ship just off the city of Aden, Yemen, which reported winds of Force 12 on the Beaufort scale, along with heavy rainfall and lightning.
- June 1889 – Curving westward away from India, a storm crossed the northern Arabian Sea and hit near the eastern tip of Oman. A computer simulation in 2009 estimated that the storm would have produced waves of 10 m (33 ft) along the northeast Omani coast.
- June 5, 1890 – After entering the Gulf of Oman, a cyclone struck Sohar in northeastern Oman after passing just northeast of Muscat, where it washed ships ashore. There, the storm dropped 286 mm (11.3 in) of rainfall over 24 hours, the highest daily precipitation total in the nation's history. High winds wrecked many houses, and about 50 people died in Muscat and nearby Muttrah. Inland flooding downed thousands of date palm trees and inundated valleys. Nationally, the storm killed at least 757 people. This was the last storm to make landfall in that region for the last 130 years until Cyclone Shaheen of 2021.
- June 2, 1898 – A strong storm moved through eastern Oman, dissipating in the Gulf of Oman.

=== 1900–1949 ===
- May 2, 1901 – Curving northward, a storm passed just east of Oman before turning to the northeast and hitting Pakistan, producing high waves along the coast.
- November 2, 1906 – A tropical storm brushed the southern coast of Socotra.
- May 26, 1911 – A severe cyclonic storm struck Oman south of Duqm.
- January 15, 1912 - A "heavy storm" destroyed more than 30 boats, with some casualties.
- May 27, 1916 – The Dhofar region of Oman was hit by a cyclonic storm.
- June 2, 1916 – Northeastern Dhofar was again struck by a cyclonic storm.
- October 13, 1921 – A long-tracked storm moving across India eventually moved ashore over southwestern Oman.
- December 6, 1922 – Originating near Sri Lanka, a long-tracked cyclone brushed the north coast of Socotra with the equivalence of hurricane-force winds, reaching at least 120 km/h (75 mph). It was the last storm of that intensity to strike the island until 2015.
- June 6, 1927 – A dissipating storm struck Oman south of Duqm.
- September 30, 1929 – Southeastern Oman was struck by a cyclone that quickly dissipated inland.
- October 25, 1948 – A storm moved through much of the eastern Arabian Peninsula, crossing from Salalah, Oman, and dissipating in the Persian Gulf near the United Arab Emirates. The storm dropped 156 mm (6.1 in) of rainfall in Salalah, which later contributed to a locust outbreak.

=== 1950–1979 ===
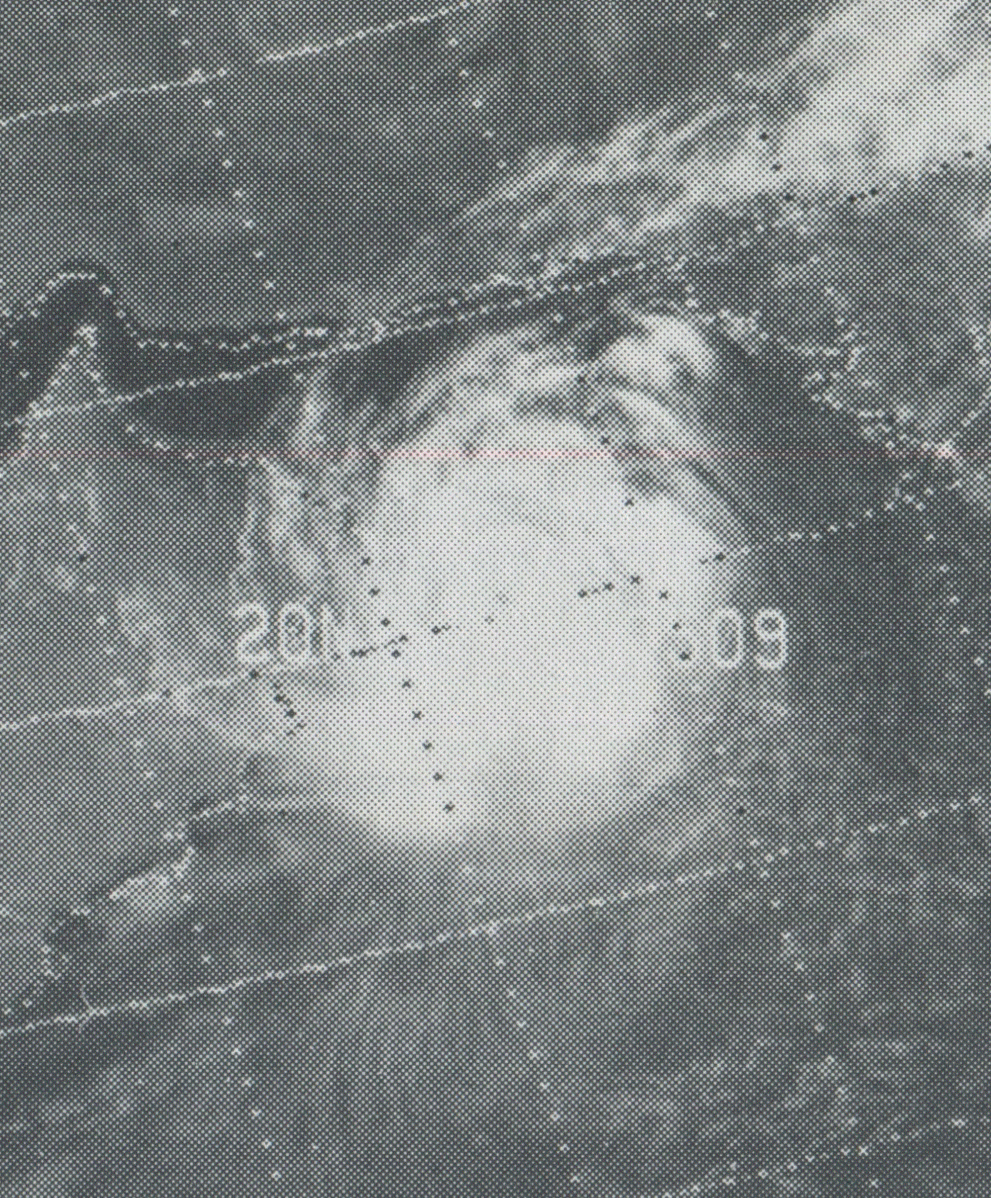
Satellite image of the 1977 Oman cyclone

- December 1957 – A cyclone developed over the Arabian Sea near the Gulf of Oman on December 27. Moving westward, the storm lashed Bahrain with winds of 180 km/h (110 mph). An offshore oil rig collapsed, killing 20 Royal Dutch Shell employees.
- May 24, 1959 – The eye of a storm passed over southwestern Oman near Raysut. Wind gusts were estimated at 167 km/h (104 mph), and the barometric pressure dropped to 968 mbar (28.6 inHg). The storm cut power supply and wrecked many local houses. Salalah recorded 117 mm (4.6 in) of rainfall, with higher totals in the mountains, washing away the road connecting Slalah and Raysut. Offshore, strong waves destroyed several boats, including a dhow carrying 141 people; all those aboard the boat were killed.
- July 18, 1959 – After originating in the Bay of Bengal and moving across India, a depression moved inland near Muscat.
- May 18, 1960 – A severe cyclonic storm moved ashore in eastern Yemen, one of only two storms of that intensity to strike the country; the other was Chapala in 2015.
- September 16, 1961 – A dissipating cyclone struck eastern Oman after moving southwestward from India.
- May 30, 1962 – A weak depression tracked over Oman south of Duqm.
- May 26, 1963 – Passing southwest of Salalah, a landfalling storm in Oman dropped 230 mm (9.1 in) of precipitation in the town, accompanied by wind gusts to 111 km/h (69 mph).
- December 7, 1963 – A cyclonic storm moved ashore in southeastern Oman, bringing gusty winds to Salalah.
- November 11, 1966 – A cyclone struck southwestern Oman and dropped 203 mm (8.0 in) of rainfall in Salalah, contributing to a locust outbreak.
- June 2, 1970 – Moving westward through the Arabian Sea, a depression passed just south of Masirah Island before dissipating over Oman.
- December 20, 1971 – A storm recurved to the northeast while brushing the southern coast of Oman.
- June 27, 1972 – A dissipating depression struck eastern Oman.
- July 2, 1972 – A weak storm moved ashore in eastern Oman.
- October 24, 1972 – Curving westward, a storm moved across northern Socotra.
- May 27, 1973 – Moving westward through the Arabian Sea, a weak storm struck the Yemenese island of Socotra before dissipating offshore, although the storm's outer periphery affected the Arabian Peninsula coastline.
- May 21, 1974 – A weakening storm struck Ash Shihr in eastern Yemen.
- October 17, 1976 – Northern Socotra was struck by a weak tropical storm.
- June 13, 1977 – With sustained winds of 165 km/h (105 mph) and gusts to 230 km/h (140 mph), a powerful cyclone hit Masirah Island and progressed onto the Omani mainland, remaining the most powerful storm to strike the Arabian Peninsula until Cyclone Gonu in 2007. The winds damaged nearly every building on Masirah Island, including at the military base, while rainfall on the island reached 430.6 mm (16.95 in) in 24 hours, more than six times the average annual precipitation there. The total was the highest daily rainfall in the period from 1977 to 2003 nationwide. Slightly higher rainfall – 482.3 mm (18.99 in) – was reported at a station 40 km (25 mi) northeast of Salalah. The cyclone was considered the worst disaster in Oman during the 20th century, causing 105 deaths.
- June 20, 1979 – A storm moved ashore near Masirah with a widespread area of gale-force winds southeast of the center.
- September 25, 1979 – Originating over southern India, a storm crossed the Arabian Sea and made landfall in Oman southwest of Masirah Island.

=== 1980–1999 ===
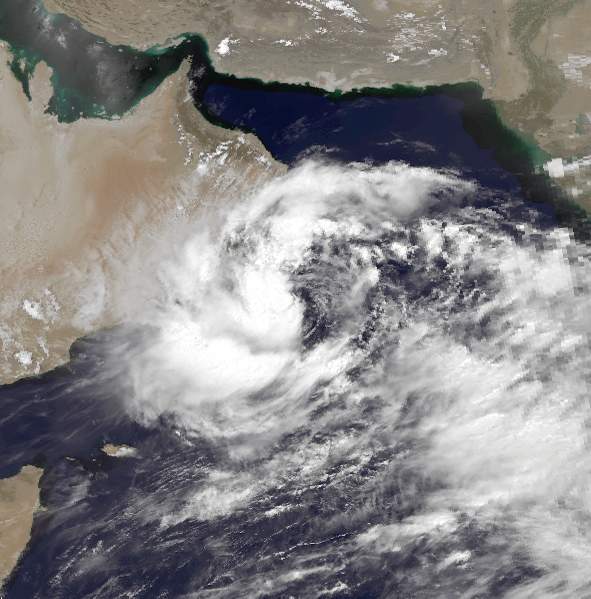
Satellite image of the 1996 Oman cyclone

- August 10, 1983 – Unofficially named Aurora, a weakening tropical storm within the monsoon struck eastern Oman and rapidly dissipated over land.
- May 25, 1984 – A developing storm moved across Socotra before moving westward through the Gulf of Aden, the first storm on record to transit the body of water.
- October 3, 1992 – About 33 mm (1.3 in) of rainfall was recorded in Sur, Oman, as a storm moved over the country.
- November 1993 – A storm affected coastal areas of Oman.
- June 9, 1994 – A weakening storm passed near Masirah Island before striking eastern Oman, later continuing into Yemen. Along the Arabian Peninsula, the cyclone produced dust storms but little rainfall.
- Late July 1995 – A monsoon depression moved through northern Oman, the United Arab Emirates, and the Empty Quarter – Rub' al Khali – of Saudi Arabia. Rainfall reached 300 mm (12 in) on Jebel Shams mountain in Oman.
- June 11, 1996 – A tropical storm struck southeastern Oman, killing one person in a fishing boat, and causing flooding in isolated areas. The remnants entered the Empty Quarter of Saudi Arabia and later progressed into Yemen, where it produced the nation's worst flooding on record. The heaviest rainfall in 70 years, reaching 189 mm (7.4 in) in Ma'rib, washed away or damaged 1,068 km (664 mi) of roads and 21 bridges, some of them dating back 2,000 years. At least 1,820 houses were destroyed, and there were 338 deaths in Yemen, with overall damage estimated at US$1.2 billion. Stagnant floodwaters caused a locust outbreak in August 1996 that affected Saudi Arabia for the next three months.
- December 17, 1998 – Rapidly weakening, a storm hit eastern Oman, killing 18 people after sinking a ship.

=== 2000–2009 ===
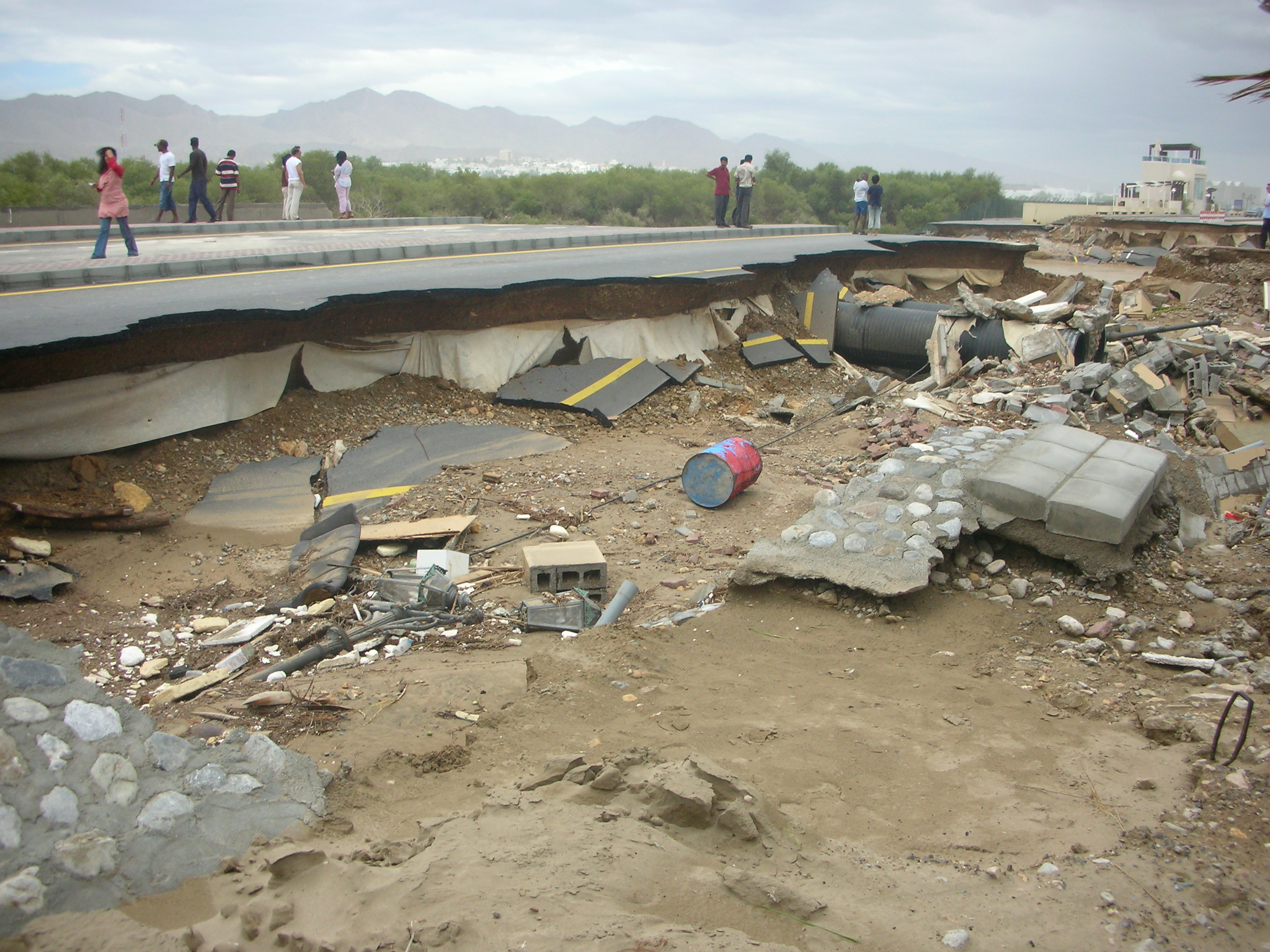
Road damage in Muscat, Oman due to Cyclone Gonu

- May 10, 2002 – A landfalling storm in Oman dropped torrential rainfall – reaching 251 mm (9.9 in) in Qairoon – which drowned hundreds of cattle and swept away several cars. The storm left US$25 million in damage and nine fatalities, including two soldiers and one police officer who drowned while rescuing other people.
- June 6, 2007 – Cyclone Gonu made landfall in extreme eastern Oman near Ras al Hadd with winds of 150 km/h (90 mph), making it the strongest tropical cyclone on record to strike the Arabian Peninsula. The storm produced winds of 100 km/h (62 mph) in the capital Muscat, with a peak gust of 180 km/h (110 mph) at Qalhat. Heavy rainfall occurred in the eastern portion of the country, peaking at 943 mm (37.1 in) on Asfar Mountain. The storm prompted the country's main oil port, Mina al Fahal, to close for three days, while also causing widespread water and power outages. The storm damaged 25,419 houses and over 13,000 vehicles. Gonu killed 50 people and caused US$4.2 billion in damage in Oman, making it the worst natural disaster on record in the country. Hundreds of people in the United Arab Emirates had to evacuate due to high waves from Gonu. The storm later crossed the Gulf of Oman and struck Iran.
- November 1, 2007 – The outer convection of a dissipating deep depression spread to the Omani coast.
- June 7, 2008 – A dissipating depression brought locally heavy rainfall to Oman.
- October 24, 2008 – A weak depression moved over southern Yemen, producing heavy rainfall that led to severe flooding. Throughout the country, the floods destroyed 2,826 houses and damaged another 3,679, leaving about 25,000 people homeless. The effects of the flooding disrupted the livelihoods of about 700,000 residents. Overall damage was estimated at US$874.8 million, although residual losses from damaged infrastructure were estimated to cost an additional US$726.9 million. The overall economic impact of the storm was therefore estimated at $1.638 billion, equating to roughly 6% of the country's gross domestic product. The depression killed 180 people in the country. It was the second worst natural disaster on record in Yemen, following the 1996 storm.

=== 2010s ===
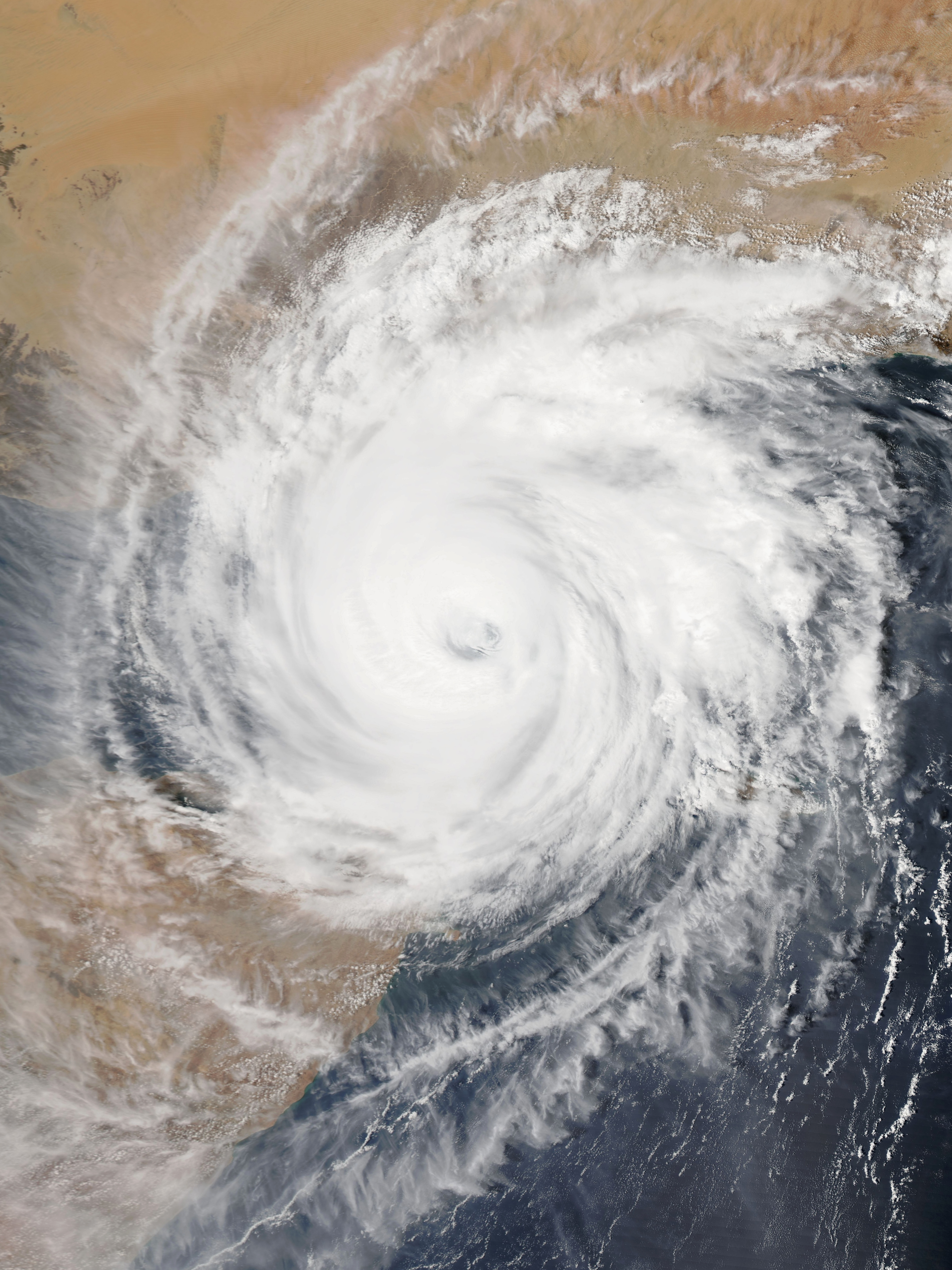
Cyclone Chapala over the Gulf of Aden

- May 23, 2010 – Cyclonic Storm Bandu drifted in the Gulf of Aden, bringing heavy rainfall to Yemen. The storm destroyed several houses on the island of Abd al Kuri, killing one girl.
- June 3, 2010 – Cyclone Phet made landfall in eastern Oman with winds of 120 km/h (75 mph) northeast of Masirah, taking what the IMD described as one of the longest and rarest tracks in the basin; the storm later turned to the east and struck Pakistan. In Oman, the storm dropped heavy rainfall and produced strong wind gusts, which temporarily stopped oil production. Phet damaged roads and power lines, and washed away hundreds of cars. Damage was estimated at 300 million rials (US$780 million), and there were 24 deaths in the country. The passage of Phet and subsequent storms led to the Omani government researching into building a fixed link with Masirah Island.
- November 2, 2011 – Cyclonic Storm Keila looped over Oman north of Salalah before re-emerging over open waters, a rare occurrence according to the IMD. The storm dropped heavy rainfall reaching about 700 mm (28 in), the equivalent to one year's worth, which caused flooding in the normally arid areas. The storm killed 14 people in Oman and injured 200, mostly in the country's north from flash flooding. Another five people drowned in a shipwreck, with nine missing. Damage was estimated at US$80 million.
- November 10, 2011 – A depression dissipated off the coast of southern Oman, producing 40 mm (1.6 in) of rainfall.
- October 31, 2014 – The outskirts of Cyclone Nilofar caused flash flooding in Al-Rustaq in northeastern Oman, killing four people after a vehicle was swept away in a flooded wadi, or dry river bed.
- June 12, 2015 – Dissipating Cyclonic Storm Ashobaa faltered off the east coast of Oman, dropping 231 mm (9.1 in) of rainfall on Masirah Island in 24 hours, equivalent to 10 times the average June rainfall. The storm caused flooding and forced schools to be closed.
- November 3, 2015 – After peaking as the second-strongest storm on record in the Arabian Sea, Cyclone Chapala became the first recorded storm to make landfall in Yemen as a very severe cyclonic storm – the equivalent of a hurricane – when it struck Ar Riyan with winds of 120 km/h (75 mph). It moved offshore and made a second landfall west of Balhaf. The storm earlier hit Socotra Island, killing 11 people while dropping the equivalent of 10 years of rainfall, estimated from 460 to 610 mm (18 to 24 in). On the Yemen mainland, satellite imagery suggested Chapala dropped several years' worth of rainfall, estimated at over 250 mm (9.8 in). On the mainland, the storm severely damaged 444 houses and wrecked primary roads in Hadhramaut Governorate. Nationwide, the storm displaced over 50,000 people, including 18,000 on Socotra. Chapala struck in the midst of an ongoing civil war.

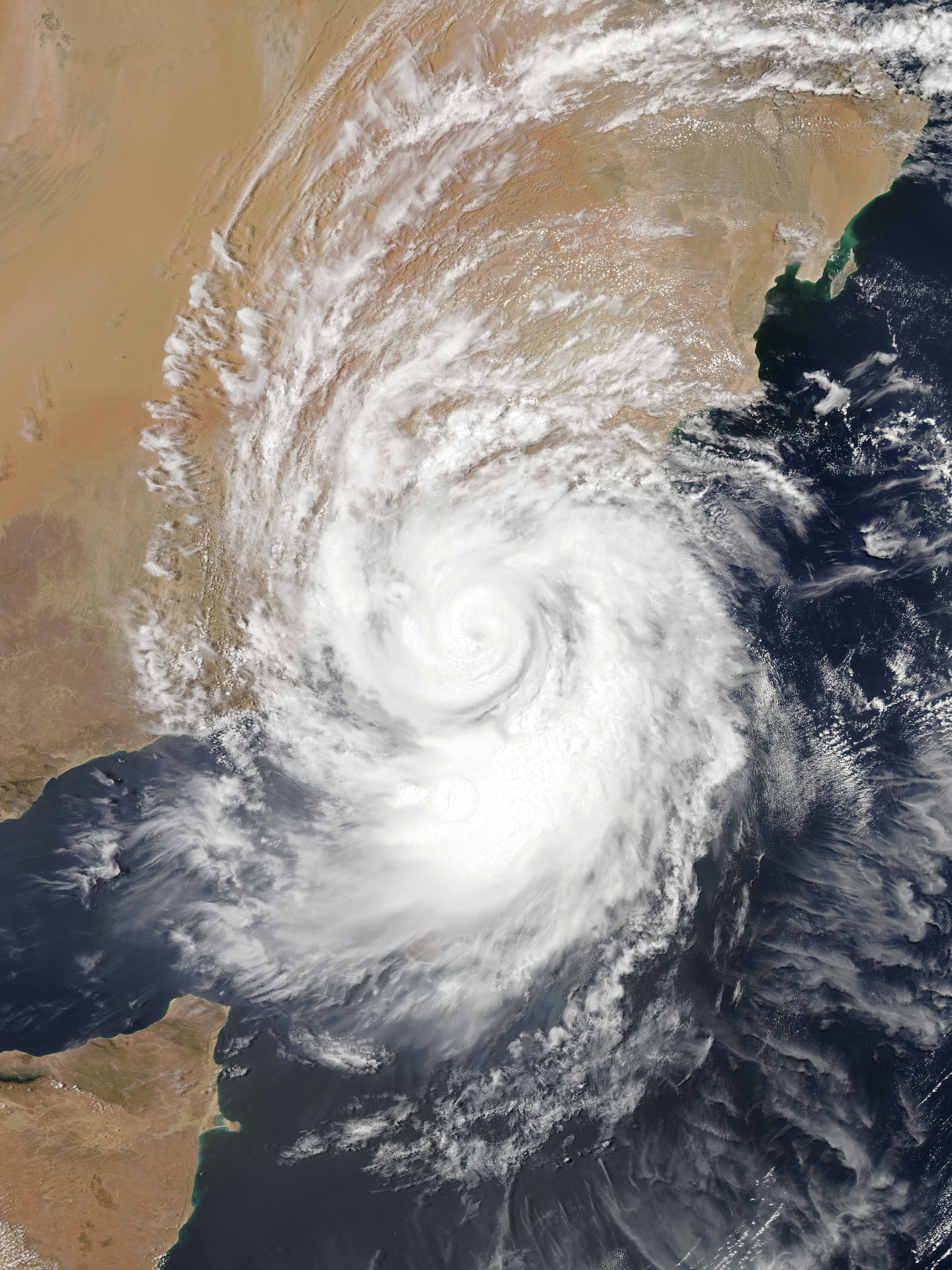
Satellite image of Cyclone Mekunu in 2018 striking Oman

- November 8, 2015 – Just days after Chapala, Cyclone Megh brought additional rainfall to the Yemenese island of Socotra, killing two people. Two days later, Megh struck the Yemen mainland northeast of Zinjibar with winds of 55 km/h (35 mph). Collectively, Megh and the earlier Chapala killed 26 people and injured 78 in Yemen.
- June 30, 2016 – A weakening depression caused some rainfall over along the coast of Oman.
- May 18, 2018 – Cyclone Sagar attained peak intensity in the Gulf of Aden, brushing Yemen's coast with damaging rainfall. The storm killed a woman when her house caught fire due to the storm.
- May 25, 2018 – Cyclone Mekunu made landfall in southwestern Oman, after brushing the Yemeni island of Socotra. The cyclone killed 31 people – 20 on Socotra, 4 on the Yemini mainland, and 7 in Oman. Damage was estimated at US$1.5 billion. Heavy rainfall created the first lakes in 20 years in Rub' al Khali, or the Empty Quarter. creating favorable breeding conditions that led to a severe locust infestation that affected 10 countries.
- October 14, 2018 - Cyclonic Storm Luban struck eastern Yemen, dropping 290 mm (11 in) of rainfall in Al Ghaydah. The storm caused US$1 billion in damage, and killed 14 people in Yemen, with 124 people injured, and about 8,000 people left homeless.
- June 16, 2019 - High waves from Cyclone Vayu flooded low-lying coastal towns in Oman, including vehicles and houses, while moving through the northeastern Arabian Sea.
- September 24, 2019 - Cyclone Hikaa struck eastern Oman near Duqm, becoming the first very severe cyclonic storm on record to strike the country in September. Hikaa dropped heavy rainfall in eastern Oman, reaching 80 mm (3.1 in). Wind gusts in Duqm reached 124 km/h (77 mph). Hundreds of properties sustained damage in the storm.
- October 30, 2019 - High waves from offshore Cyclone Kyarr caused flooding in low-lying coastal towns in Oman and the United Arab Emirates. The cyclone paralleled the coastline of the Arabian Peninsula while moving southwestward.

=== 2020s ===
- May 29, 2020 - A depression formed near the border of Oman and Yemen, and stalled over that region until it degenerated into a low pressure area on June 1. The highest precipitation total was measured in Mirbat, Oman, where 1,055 mm (41.5 in) of rain fell. Two people drowned in a wadi due to flash floods, while another person died and three were injured when a building collapsed.
- October 3, 2021 - Formed from the remnants of Cyclone Gulab, Cyclone Shaheen formed on September 30. It became the first cyclone to transit through the Gulf of Oman since Cyclone Phet of 2010 and made an extremely rare landfall between the cities of Sohar and Muscat in Oman on October 3, becoming the first such system to do so since reliable records began in 1891.
- October 23, 2023 - Cyclone Tej formed on October 19 and skirted the coast of Socotra in its peak intensity on October 21, before making landfall over Al Mahrah Governorate of Yemen on October 23. Becoming the first cyclone to do so since Cyclone Luban of 2018.

== Climatological statistics ==
Storms affecting the Arabian Peninsula by month
Month	Number of storms
May	15
June	19
July	3
August	1
September	4
October	10
November	8
December	5

Storms affecting the Arabian Peninsula by period
Period	Number of storms
1800s	5
1900–49	10
1950s	3
1960s	6
1970s	11
1980s	2
1990s	6
2000s	5
2010s	15
2020s	3

== See also ==
- List of Horn of Africa tropical cyclones
- List of tropical cyclones in Pakistan
