= Cyclone Keila =

North Indian cyclone in 2011

Cyclonic Storm Keila
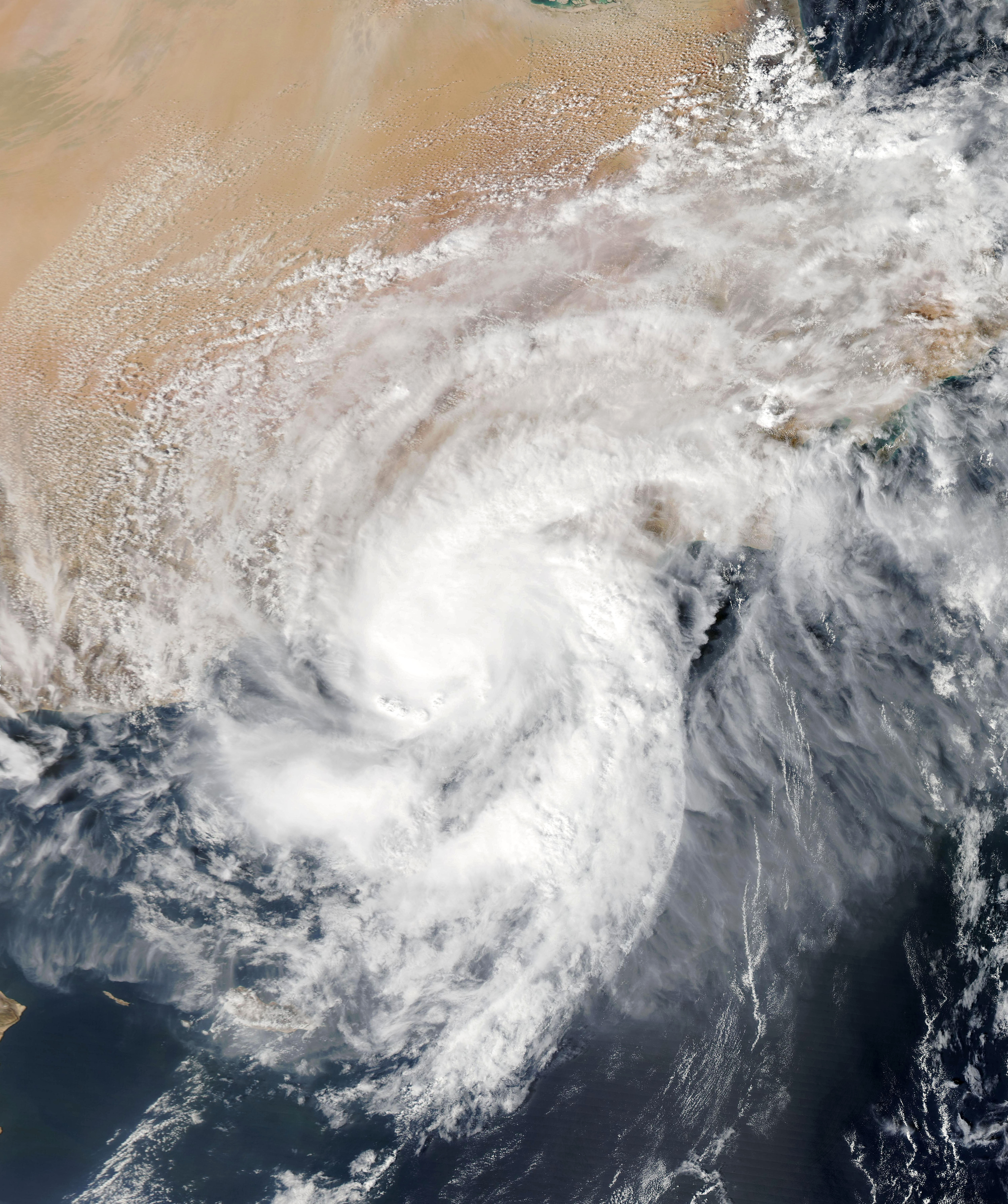
- Cyclonic Storm Keila near Oman coast on November 2, near peak intensity.

Meteorological history
- Formed: October 29, 2011
- Dissipated: November 4, 2011

Cyclonic storm
- 3-minute sustained (IMD)
- Highest winds: 65 km/h (40 mph)
- Lowest pressure: 996 hPa (mbar); 29.41 inHg

Tropical storm
- 1-minute sustained (SSHWS/JTWC)
- Highest winds: 100 km/h (65 mph)
- Lowest pressure: 982 hPa (mbar); 29.00 inHg

Overall effects
- Fatalities: 19
- Missing: 9
- Damage: $80 million (2011 USD)
- Areas affected: Oman, Yemen
- IBTrACS
- Part of the 2011 North Indian Ocean cyclone season

Cyclonic Storm Keila (Note: The name Keila (Dhivehi: ކޭލަ; [keːla]) was contributed by the Maldives and refers to the six-finger threadfin (Polydactylus sexfilis) in Dhivehi.) (IMD designation: ARB 02, JTWC designation: 03A) was the first named storm of the 2011 North Indian Ocean cyclone season. A weak system for much of its duration, Keila developed in the western Arabian Sea in late October 2011, amid an area of marginally favorable conditions. On November 2, it briefly organized enough to be classified as a cyclonic storm, which has maximum sustained winds of at least 65 km/h (40 mph). Given the name Keila by the India Meteorological Department (IMD), the storm quickly moved ashore southern Oman near Salalah, and weakened while meandering over the country. The remnants soon after moved offshore, dissipating on November 4.

The storm brought heavy rainfall to Oman, reaching just over 700 mm (28 in) in the mountains near Salalah. Moisture from the storm spread across most of the country, causing flash flooding near the capital Muscat. Floods from the storm killed 14 people, injured over 200, washed away hundreds of cars, and damaged many buildings. Two hospitals were damaged, forcing 60 patients to be evacuated elsewhere by helicopter. Overall damage was estimated at US$80 million (2011 USD). Offshore, Keila capsized a boat originating from India, killing five of the crew and leaving another nine missing; six sailors were rescued by the Omani Coast Guard.

== Meteorological history ==
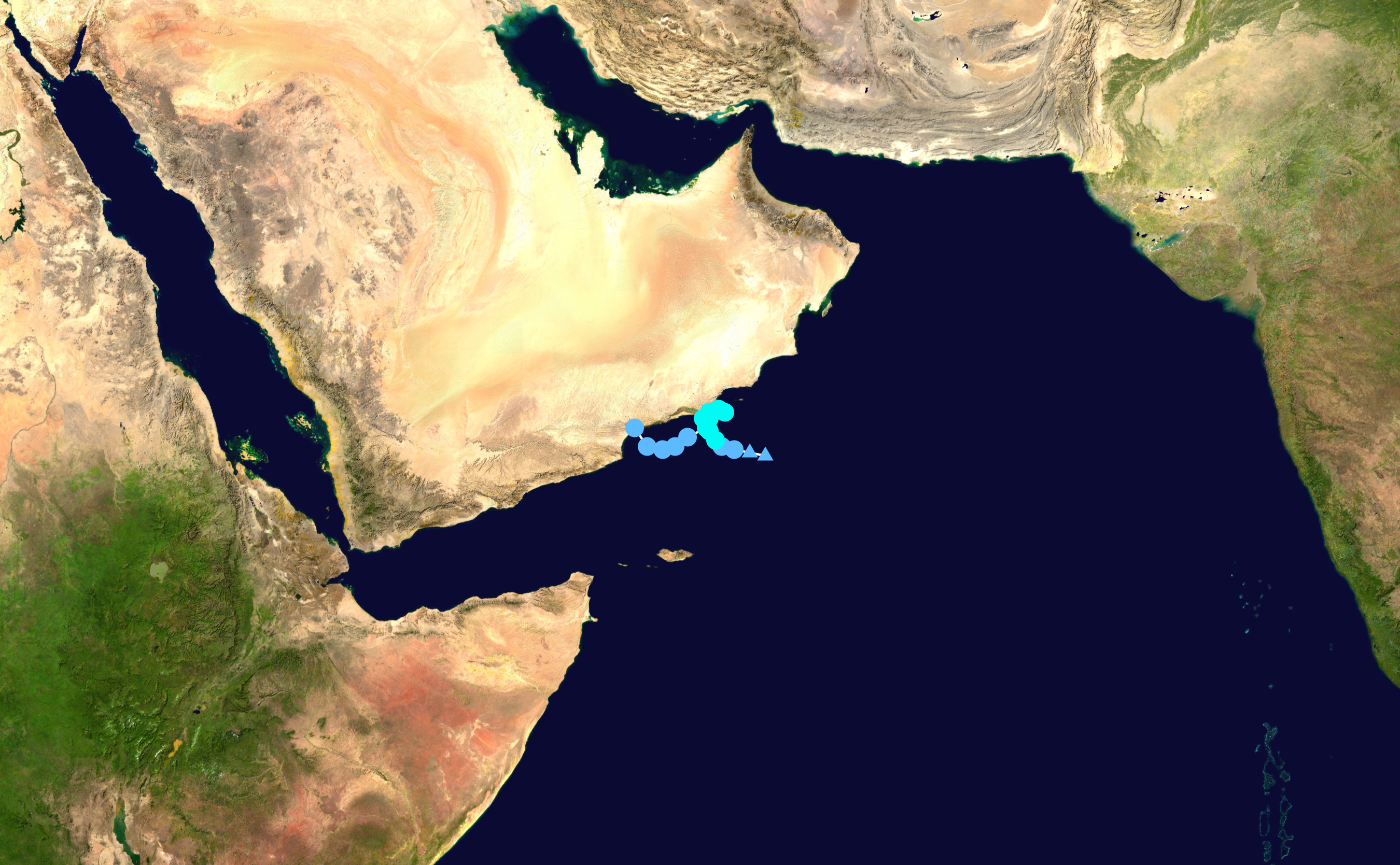
Map plotting the storm's track and intensity, according to the Saffir–Simpson scale Map key Saffir–Simpson scale Tropical depression (≤38 mph, ≤62 km/h) Tropical storm (39–73 mph, 63–118 km/h) Category 1 (74–95 mph, 119–153 km/h) Category 2 (96–110 mph, 154–177 km/h) Category 3 (111–129 mph, 178–208 km/h) Category 4 (130–156 mph, 209–251 km/h) Category 5 (≥157 mph, ≥252 km/h) Unknown Storm type Tropical cyclone Subtropical cyclone Extratropical cyclone, remnant low, tropical disturbance, or monsoon depression

The Intertropical Convergence Zone produced an area of convection in the southeastern Arabian Sea toward the end of October 2011. The overall system moved west-northwestward, developing a distinct low-pressure area on October 27. By that time, the thunderstorm activity was still disorganized and associated with a weak circulation. Environmental conditions were unfavorable initially, consisting of strong wind shear and dry air. An anticyclone over the system caused the shear to decrease by October 28, amid warm water temperatures of 29 °C (84 °F), both more favorable conditions. By that time the circulation became well-defined, although still elongated, and the convection was still scattered. On October 29, the India Meteorological Department (IMD) designated the system as Depression ARB 02 about 885 km (550 mi) east of the Yemeni island of Socotra.

Convection continued to organize and deepen as the nascent depression continued west-northwestward, steered by a ridge to the north. However, dry air from the Arabian Peninsula and cooler waters proved deleterious to the system, and the circulation became more disorganized on October 30. Despite the marginally favorable conditions, the overall structure improved on November 1, with pronounced outflow developing along the western periphery. A nearby buoy reported a barometric pressure of 998 mbar (29.5 inHg), which confirmed the increasing organization. At 03:00 UTC on November 1, the IMD upgraded the depression to a deep depression, and 24 hours later to Cyclonic Storm Keila. By that time, the agency estimated peak 3 minute sustained winds of 65 km/h (40 mph) while the storm was just 150 km (95 mi) southeast of Oman. The American-based Joint Typhoon Warning Center (JTWC) also designated the system as Tropical Cyclone 03A at 03:00 UTC on November 2.

With cool waters and an unfavorable phase of the Madden–Julian oscillation, Keila failed to intensify significantly as it approached the southeastern Arabian Peninsula. An irregular central dense overcast developed over the circulation, consisting of shallow convection. A passing trough weakened the ridge to the north, steering Keila toward the north. After weakening to a deep depression again, Keila made landfall near Salalah, Oman around 18:00 UTC on November 2. Around that time, the JTWC discontinued advisories, once the storm was weakening rapidly over land. With a ridge to the north and east, Keila followed the track of the anticyclone aloft, which brought it back offshore Oman on November 3. Such looping near the coast was considered rare by the IMD. According to the agency, the system continued eastward and dissipated on November 4. However, the JTWC tracked the system further in a post-season analysis, estimating that Keila intensified once offshore and attained peak winds of 100 km/h (60 mph) on November 3. The agency assessed that the storm turned to the southwest and weakened, only to turn back to the northwest and dissipate over extreme eastern Yemen on November 5.

== Preparations and impact ==
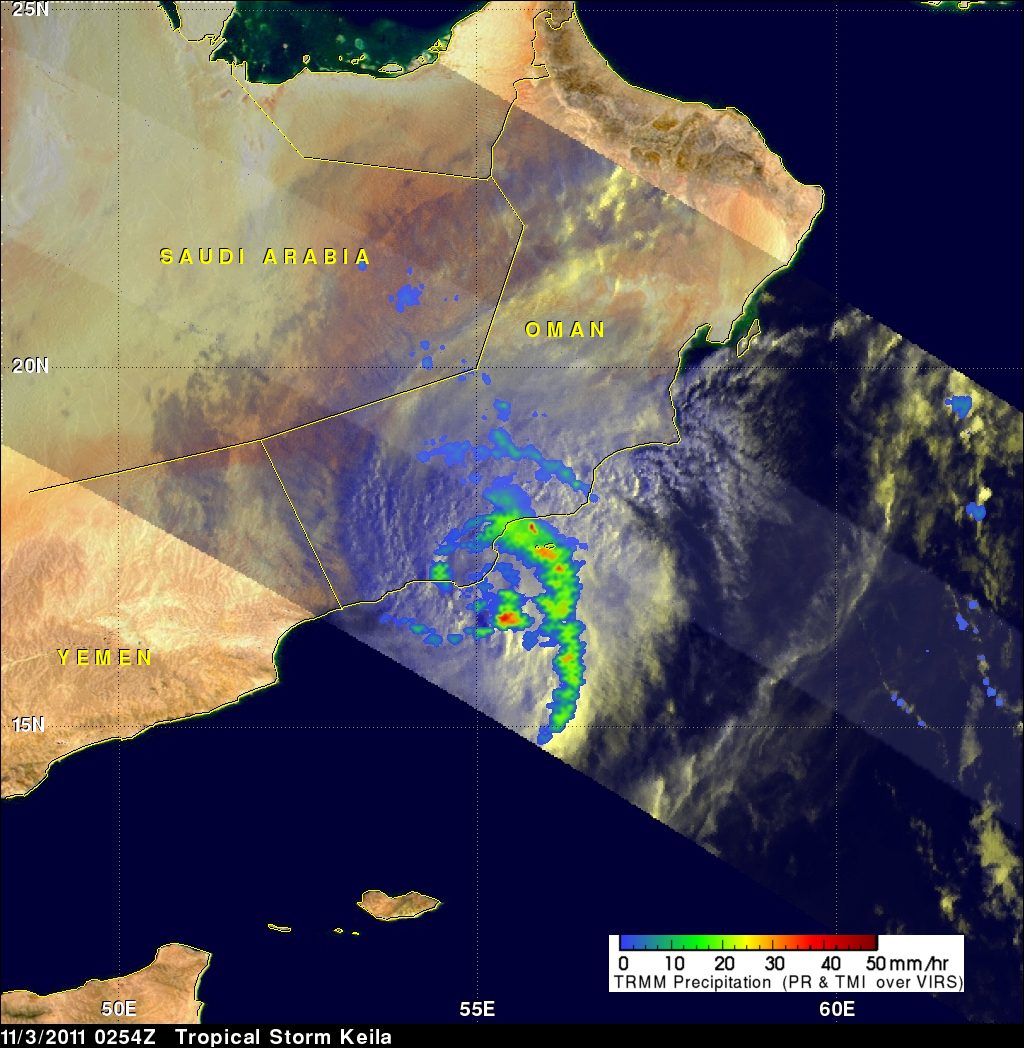
Tropical Rainfall Measuring Mission estimate of precipitation from Keila over Oman

There was confusion in the country over Keila's intensity; the IMD classified it as a cyclonic storm, while officials in Oman designated it as a deep depression, based on available observations. Officials warned residents of the potential for heavy rainfall. The Pakistani government also warned fishermen not to venture to the open seas, due to the uncertain effects of the storm.

While Keila was offshore and still in its developmental stages, it brought winds of 41 km/h (25 mph) to Salalah International Airport, and at the time of landfall, the station reported slightly stronger winds of 43 km/h (26 mph). However, the storm's most severe effects were related to the heavy rainfall it produced over Oman, which peaked at just over 700 mm (28 in) in the mountains near Salalah. In southern Oman, Keila dropped 50 to 100 mm (2.0 to 3.9 in) of rainfall at Salalah, the equivalent of a year's worth of precipitation. Moisture from the storm coalesced over the Al Hajar Mountains in northern Oman, producing severe thunderstorms that led to flash flooding. Across southern Oman where the storm crossed, there were no deaths; all of the deaths occurred due to the flash floods in northern Oman, where 14 people lost their lives. Three people were killed due to electrocutions, another two were crushed to death by large objects, and nine drowned. Overall damage was estimated at US$80 million, and over 200 people were injured nationwide.

The rains caused wadis – typically dry riverbeds – to accumulate with floodwaters, washing away hundreds of cars and disrupting traffic. Police officers helped rescue victims who were stranded in flooded wadis. Some drivers rode out the floods on the roofs of their cars. The deluge also damaged crops and farm buildings elsewhere in the country. Damage was heaviest near the capital city Muscat, where houses and businesses were damaged by the floods, and there were many traffic accidents. A school bus was swept away in Wadi Kabir, although the students were soon after rescued by local authorities. Several buildings collapsed in Sur due to the rains. In the valley near Al-Rustaq, floodwaters swept away cars, dead animals, and property, with water levels reaching 1.8 m (5.9 ft) high in some places. The floods damaged two hospitals in northern Oman; police helicopters transferred 60 patients after the facilities were closed for maintenance, and other patients were moved to other local hospitals. Just days after Keila dissipated, another deep depression threatened Oman and brought additional rainfall.

Sailing from the Indian state of Gujarat to Dubai, a ship with the call sign MSV Shiv Sagar MNV 2169 encountered Keila offshore southern Oman. The storm's high winds caused the boat to capsize, killing five of the sailors, and leaving nine others missing. Six of the crew were rescued by the Omani Coast Guard.

== See also ==
- List of Arabian Peninsula tropical cyclones
- 2008 Yemen cyclone – slow-moving storm that produced deadly flooding in Yemen, killing 180 people
