= 1977 Oman cyclone =

North Indian cyclone in 1977

Severe Cyclonic Storm 02A
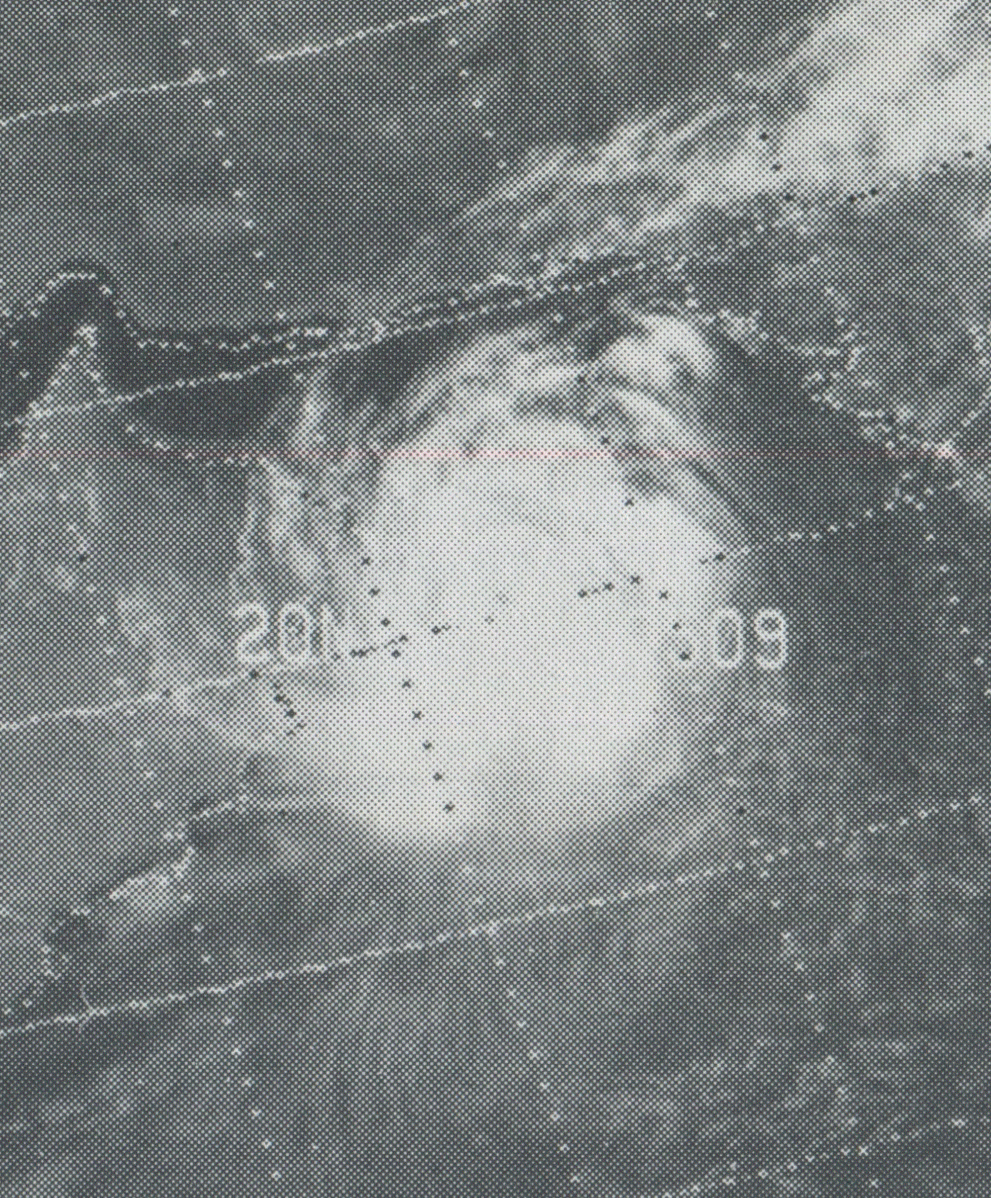
- Satellite image of the storm on June 12, 1977

Meteorological history
- Formed: June 6, 1977
- Dissipated: June 14, 1977

Extremely severe cyclonic storm
- 3-minute sustained (IMD)
- Highest winds: 165 km/h (105 mph)
- Lowest pressure: 959 hPa (mbar); 28.32 inHg

Tropical storm
- 1-minute sustained (SSHWS/JTWC)
- Highest winds: 110 km/h (70 mph)

Overall effects
- Fatalities: At least 105
- Areas affected: Oman
- Part of the 1977 North Indian Ocean cyclone season

The 1977 Oman cyclone was the deadliest tropical cyclone on record to strike Oman. The storm formed off the west coast of India in the Arabian Sea, and curved westward to reach peak winds of 110 km/h (68 mph). The storm struck Masirah Island and later southern Oman on June 13, before dissipating the next day over Saudi Arabia. Producing wind gusts to 230 km/h (140 mph), the storm was the strongest cyclone on record to hit the Arabian Peninsula until Cyclone Gonu hit in 2007. About 95% of Marisah Island was damaged by the strong winds, including much of the military base. The cyclone dropped 430.6 mm (16.95 in) of rainfall over a 24-hour period on Marisah, which was the highest daily total in the country as of 2003. Overall, the storm killed at least 105 people and left 50,000 homeless.

== Meteorological history ==
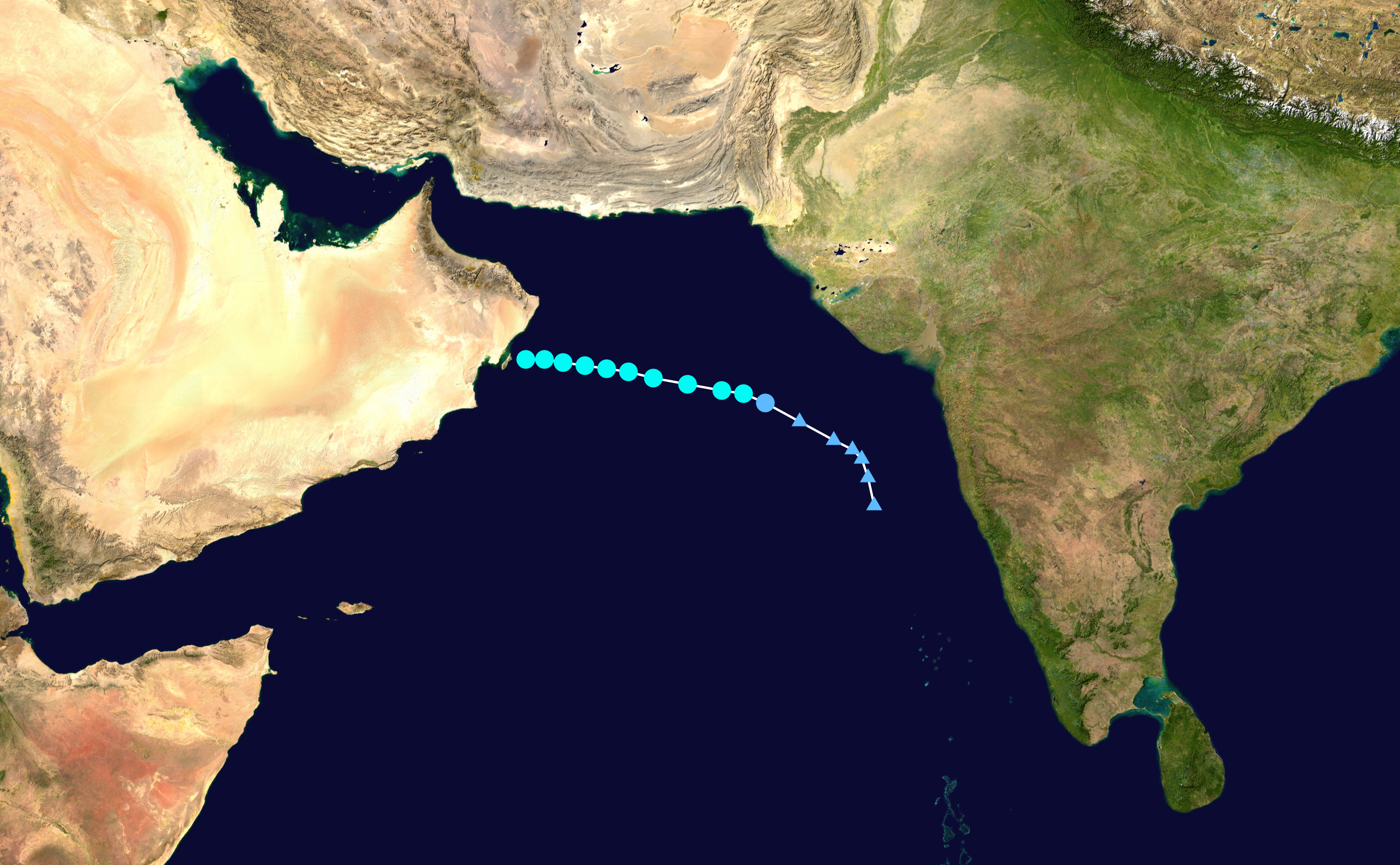
Map plotting the storm's track and intensity, according to the Saffir–Simpson scale Map key Saffir–Simpson scale Tropical depression (≤38 mph, ≤62 km/h) Tropical storm (39–73 mph, 63–118 km/h) Category 1 (74–95 mph, 119–153 km/h) Category 2 (96–110 mph, 154–177 km/h) Category 3 (111–129 mph, 178–208 km/h) Category 4 (130–156 mph, 209–251 km/h) Category 5 (≥157 mph, ≥252 km/h) Unknown Storm type Tropical cyclone Subtropical cyclone Extratropical cyclone, remnant low, tropical disturbance, or monsoon depression

On June 6, a monsoon depression formed in the Arabian Sea about 500 km (310 mi) south-southwest of Goa, India. It initially paralleled the Indian coastline, becoming a tropical storm on June 9 with a minimum barometric pressure of 986 mbar (29.1 inHg). That day, the Joint Typhoon Warning Center (JTWC) began tracking the system. The storm moved northward, followed by a northwest turn on June 10. It curved toward the west, and the JTWC reported the cyclone as reaching peak 1–minute sustained winds of 110 km/h (68 mph) on June 11. In addition, the India Meteorological Department estimated the system became a severe cyclonic storm, which has sustained winds of at least 118 km/h (73 mph). On June 12, the storm attained a minimum pressure of 975 mbar (28.8 inHg) while continuing westward.

On June 13, the eye of the cyclone passed over Masirah Island for a 40-minute period, producing peak sustained winds of 167 km/h (104 mph) and a minimum pressure of 956 mbar (28.2 inHg). The JTWC issued the final advisory at 0800 UTC that day. The Oman Department of Meteorology reported the storm as being much stronger than the JTWC, with sustained winds of 105 mph (169 km/h) and gusts to 230 km/h (140 mph). The cyclone was the strongest on record to make landfall on the Arabian Peninsula, until Cyclone Gonu surpassed it in 2007. Shortly after striking Masirah, the storm moved ashore mainland Oman, causing rapid weakening to tropical depression status. The system dissipated on June 14 after crossing into southeastern Saudi Arabia.

== Impact and aftermath ==
Along the southwest coast of India, the storm produced high swells of up to 7 m (23 ft) in conjunction with the monsoon. The waves affected several drilling rigs operated by the Oil and Natural Gas Corporation, forcing work to shut down. The tanker Texaco Plymouth experienced significant structural damage from the storm, losing two lifeboats. The freighter Buxom Island in the central Arabian Sea experienced 139 km/h (86 mph) winds before sinking, which took the lives of 23 of its crew.

The military base in Masirah was first warned about the cyclone on June 11. The next day, officials there raised a Category 3 warning, which was soon upgraded to Category 2. Aircraft were stored in hangars, and workers inspected the roofs of buildings before riding out the storm in a shelter. Hurricane-force winds struck during the morning hours of June 13, with sustained winds peaking at 167 km/h (104 mph) and gusts to 200 km/h (120 mph). After a lull during the eye's passage, winds then increased out of the southwest towards 185 km/h (115 mph). The strong winds caused buildings to collapse and roof beams to be blown through the air. Every building at the base sustained damage, and virtually all homes in the nearby village were leveled. The radio relay station on the island was also damaged. Overall, the storm wrecked about 95% of the buildings in Masirah, leaving 2,000 people homeless there. Rain totals were significant, with a total of 482.3 mm (18.99 in) falling 40 kilometres (25 mi) northeast of Salalah. A station on Masirah Island reported 430.6 mm (16.95 in) in 24 hours, more than six times the average annual precipitation there. The total was the highest daily rainfall in the period from 1977 to 2003 nationwide. Floods washed away thousands of animals as well as lime and palm-tree plantations, downing thousands of trees across the region. The rains flooded the main highway from Muscat to Salalah, and also accumulated in the typically dry Dhofar region. There, most drains were unable to withstand the unusual flooding.

The cyclone was considered the worst disaster in Oman during the 20th century, and remains the deadliest cyclone as of 2010. Overall, the cyclone caused 105 deaths, and over 5,000 injuries, and left about 20,000 people homeless. The death toll is disputed, as another report indicated 110 deaths in Oman. After the storm, neighboring Saudi Arabia sent assistance to Oman, as did other nations in the Persian Gulf. The cyclone struck before the nation created a coordinated disaster network in 1988; as a result, the relief work was spread among various agencies.

== See also ==
- List of Arabian Peninsula tropical cyclones
- Cyclone Gonu
- Cyclone Phet
