= Cyclone Sagar =

Tropical cyclone which made landfall in Somalia and Somaliland

Cyclonic Storm Sagar
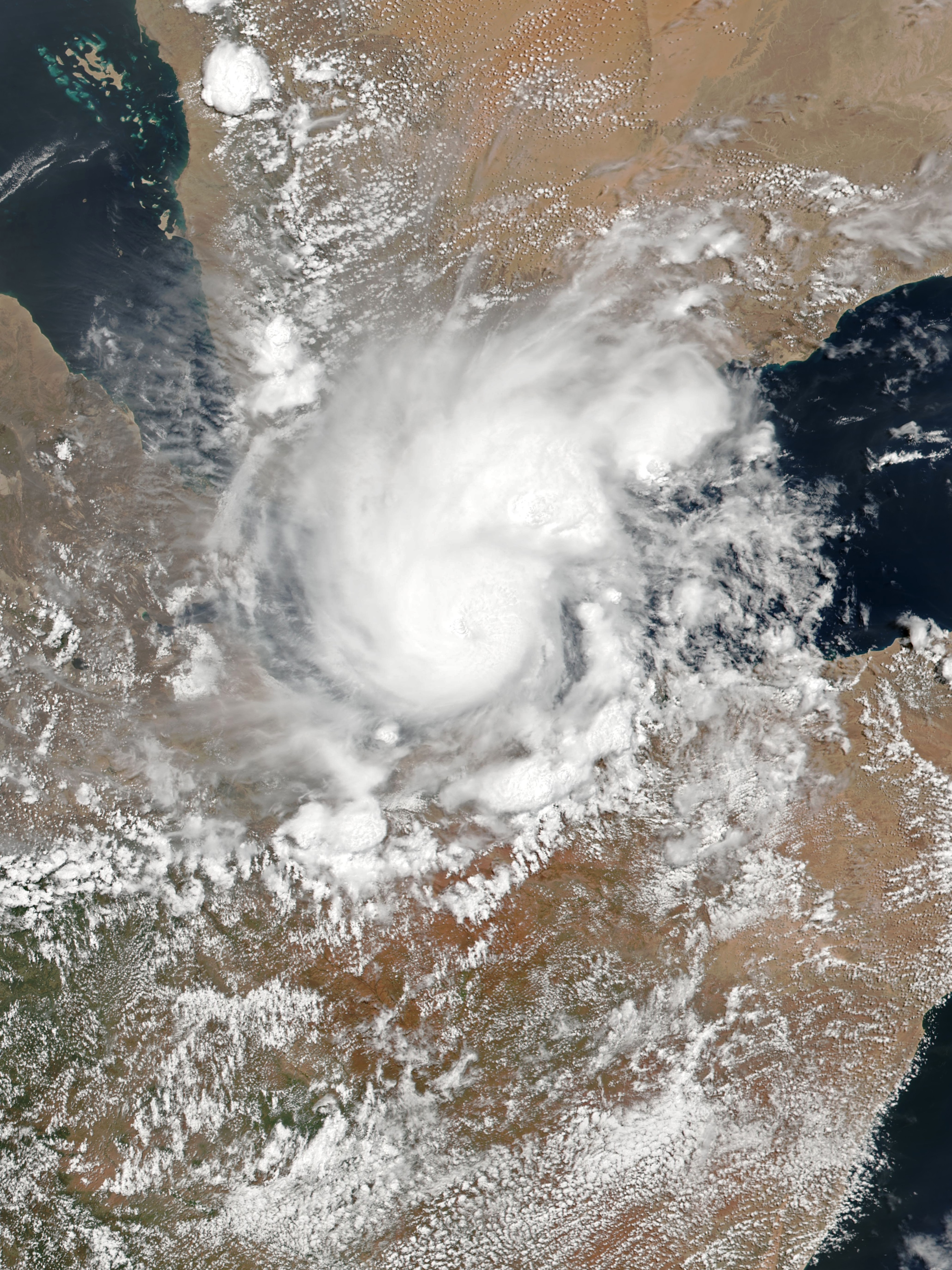
- Sagar at peak intensity in the western Gulf of Aden on May 18

Meteorological history
- Formed: May 16, 2018
- Dissipated: May 20, 2018

Cyclonic storm
- 3-minute sustained (IMD)
- Highest winds: 85 km/h (50 mph)
- Lowest pressure: 994 hPa (mbar); 29.35 inHg

Category 1-equivalent tropical cyclone
- 1-minute sustained (SSHWS/JTWC)
- Highest winds: 120 km/h (75 mph)
- Lowest pressure: 974 hPa (mbar); 28.76 inHg

Overall effects
- Fatalities: 79 total
- Damage: $30 million (2018 USD)
- Areas affected: Yemen, Somalia, Somaliland, Djibouti, Ethiopia
- IBTrACS
- Part of the 2018 North Indian Ocean cyclone season

Cyclonic Storm Sagar (Note: The name Sagar (Hindi: सागर; [säːɡɐɾ]) was contributed by India and means "ocean" in Hindi.) was the strongest tropical cyclone to make landfall in Somalia and Somaliland in recorded history until Gati in 2020, and the first named cyclone of the 2018 North Indian Ocean cyclone season. Forming on May 16 east of the Guardafui Channel, Sagar intensified into a cyclonic storm on the next day, as it gradually organized. The storm turned to the west-southwest and traversed the entirety of the Gulf of Aden, making landfall over Somaliland on May 19, farther west than any other storm on record in the North Indian Ocean. Sagar weakened into a remnant low on May 20.

The storm first affected Yemen, brushing the coast with heavy rainfall and gusty winds. One person was killed when her house caught fire. In Somalia, Sagar dropped a years' worth of rainfall, or around 200 mm (7.9 in). The rains caused deadly flash flooding that washed away bridges, homes, and thousands of farm animals. Sagar killed 53 people throughout the region – 3 in Puntland in Somalia and 50 in Somaliland. In neighboring Djibouti, heavy rainfall killed two people and damaged 1,800 houses, forcing 3,000 people to leave their houses. Damage in the country reached US$30 million. Sagar's rainfall extended into eastern Ethiopia, damaging schools and houses, and causing a landslide that killed 23 people.

== Meteorological history ==
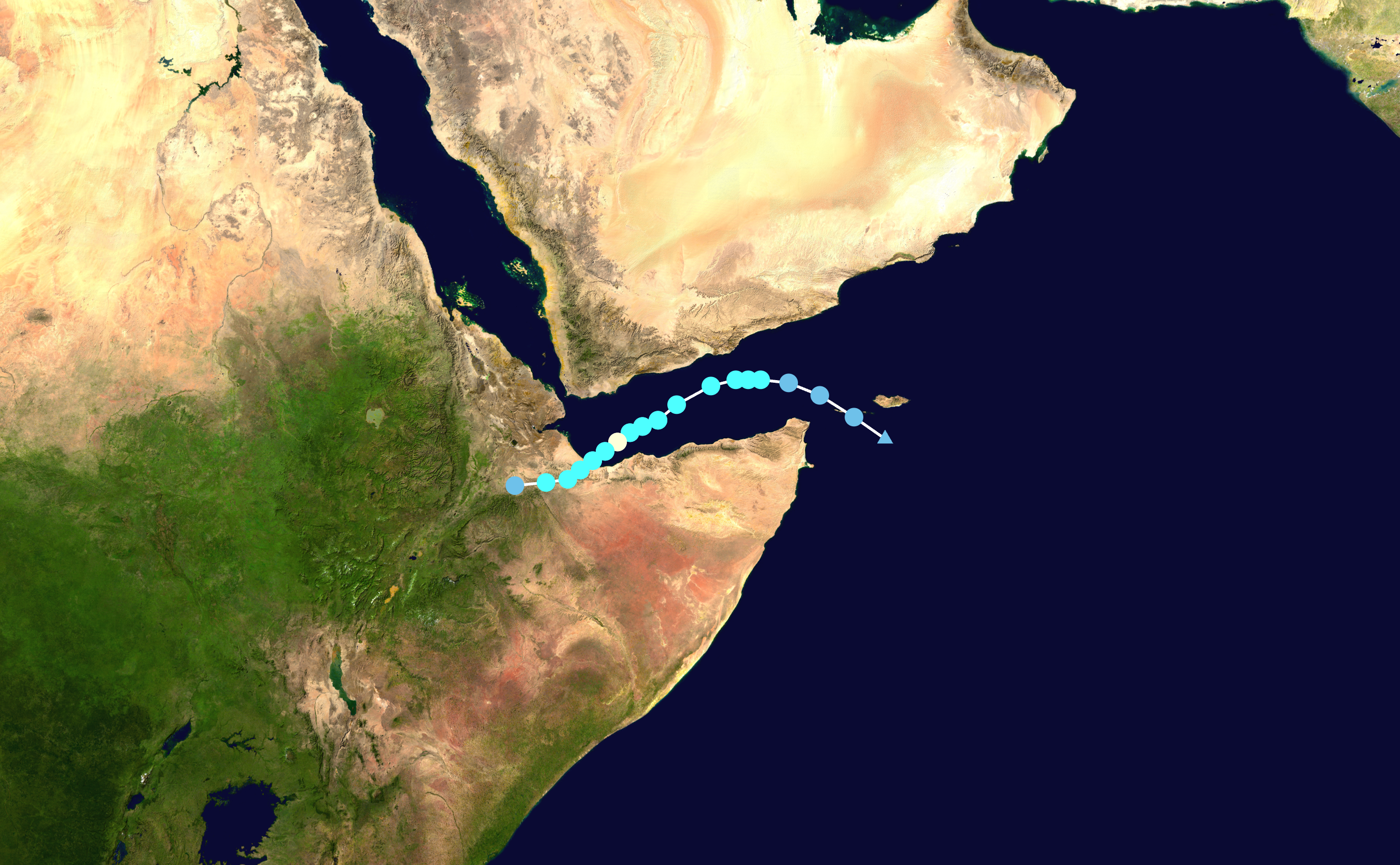
Map plotting the storm's track and intensity, according to the Saffir–Simpson scale Map key Saffir–Simpson scale Tropical depression (≤38 mph, ≤62 km/h) Tropical storm (39–73 mph, 63–118 km/h) Category 1 (74–95 mph, 119–153 km/h) Category 2 (96–110 mph, 154–177 km/h) Category 3 (111–129 mph, 178–208 km/h) Category 4 (130–156 mph, 209–251 km/h) Category 5 (≥157 mph, ≥252 km/h) Unknown Storm type Tropical cyclone Subtropical cyclone Extratropical cyclone, remnant low, tropical disturbance, or monsoon depression

In mid-May, an area of convection persisted in the western Arabian Sea, to the southeast of the island of Socotra. Minimal wind shear and warm water temperatures favored development. A low-pressure area formed on May 14 and gradually became more defined as it moved northwestward past Socotra. On May 16, the India Meteorological Department (IMD) classified the low as a depression at 12:00 UTC about 200 km (120 mi) northeast of Cape Guardafui, Somalia. A few hours later, the American-based Joint Typhoon Warning Center (JTWC) designated the weather system as Tropical Cyclone 01A, once the convection consolidated into organized rainbands to the north and south of the center. The agency noted the potential for land interaction to limit strengthening. Otherwise, environmental conditions favored further strengthening as the storm moved northwestward, steered by a ridge to the northeast and the flow of the regional geography.

The IMD upgraded the depression to a deep depression on May 17, after the weather system entered the Gulf of Aden. A few hours later, the agency upgraded the deep depression further to a cyclonic storm, naming it Sagar. The name Sagar was given by India. The storm turned westward and later southwestward, paralleling offshore the coast of Yemen. With the convection supported by upper-level outflow to the north, Sagar continued to intensify. It developed an eye on microwave imagery. Late on May 18, the IMD estimated that Sagar attained peak 3 minute sustained winds of 85 km/h (55 mph), based on the organized structure on satellite imagery. Around the same time, the JTWC estimated Sagar attained peak 1 minute sustained winds of 120 km/h (75 mph), while located about 165 km (103 mi) south of Aden, Yemen, or about 95 km (59 mi) north of Berbera, Somaliland.

As Sagar approached the coastline of the western Gulf of Aden, the convection to the south of the storm's center weakened. Between 08:00–09:00 UTC on May 19, the storm made landfall near Lughaya in northwestern Somaliland, with winds of 75 km/h (45 mph). According to the JTWC, Sagar was the strongest tropical cyclone on record to strike Somalia, with estimated 1-minute landfalling winds of 95 km/h (60 mph), but it was overtaken by Cyclone Gati, with 140 km/h (85 mph) on 3 min winds. The storm also made the westernmost landfall in the North Indian Ocean, surpassing a tropical storm in 1984, which took a nearly identical track to the east. The thunderstorms quickly weakened as Sagar progressed inland. On May 20, Sagar weakened into a well-marked low-pressure area over eastern Ethiopia.

== Preparations and impact ==
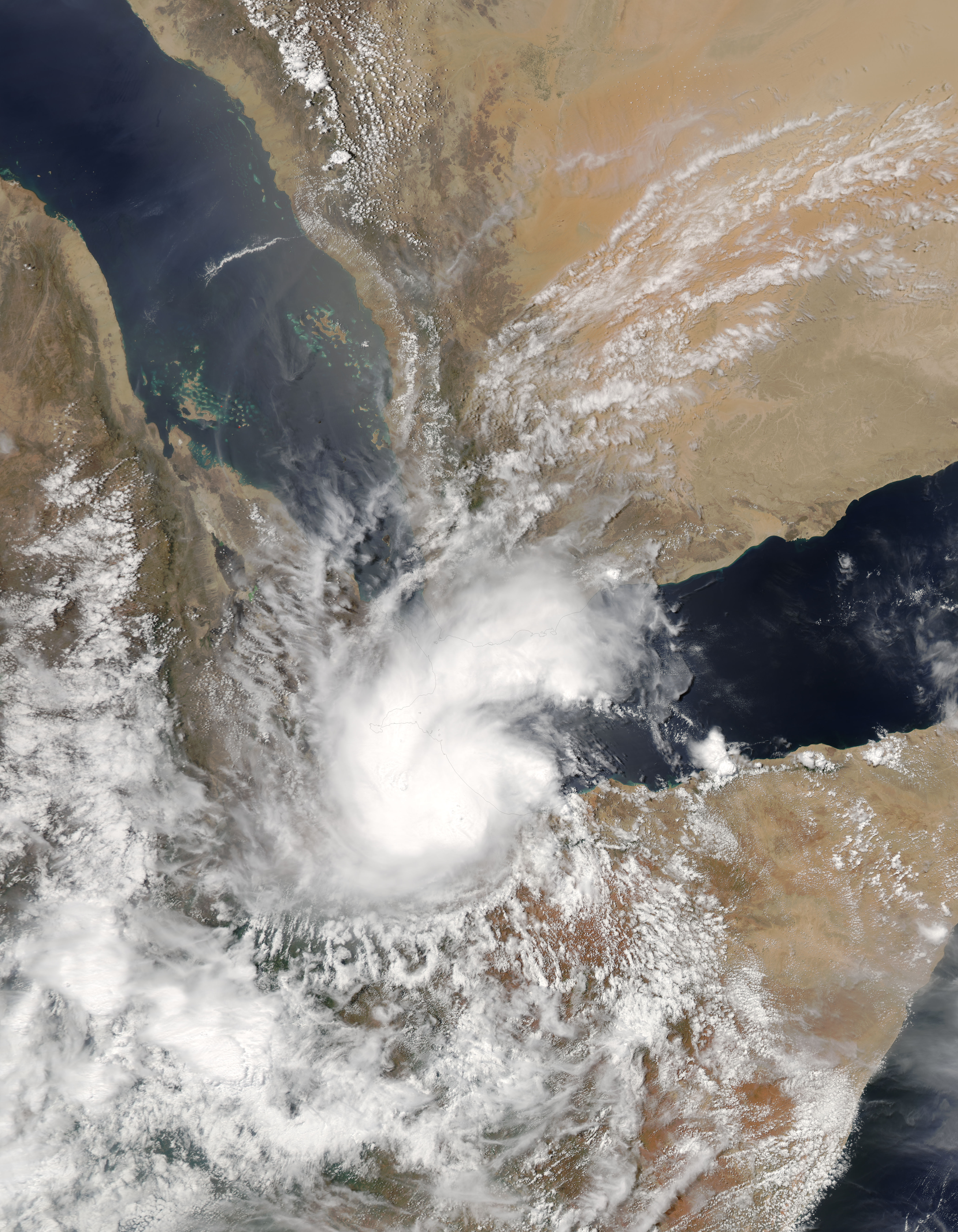
Cyclone Sagar shortly after landfall in Somalia on May 19

Along its rare trajectory through the Gulf of Aden, Cyclonic Storm Sagar affected Socotra and coastal Yemen, Somaliland, Somalia, Djibouti, and Ethiopia. Strong winds from Sagar damaged houses on Yemen's mainland. Heavy rainfall along the coast caused isolated flooding, which damaged roads and electric infrastructure. Yemen's temporary capital Aden was hit by strong winds as Sagar approached, and authorities evacuated residents near the coast. An elderly woman was killed when her house caught fire near Aden.

In Puntland in northern Somalia and Somaliland, officials warned residents about the storm on the radio and mobile communications. Mayors urged residents in low-lying and coastal areas to evacuate. The Somaliland Coast Guard readied emergency vehicles in Zeila. Following a protracted drought, parts of eastern Africa experienced severe floods in the months before the storm's arrival.

Beginning on May 17, Sagar dropped heavy rainfall in northern Somalia and Somaliland, in some parts up to a years' worth of rainfall, or around 200 mm (7.9 in). Although the rains alleviated drought conditions, Sagar also caused deadly flash flooding that carried away houses. In Awdal region, the storm displaced 2,590 people. Thousands of farmers faced food insecurity when the floods wrecked 700 farms, with 277 hectares (680 acres) of arable land destroyed. The floods killed 1,260 goats and sheep, 56 camels, and 19 donkeys. Floods damaged 39 schools and several facilities, and also washed out roads, especially in rural areas. Flash floods in Bari province killed three people. Two of the deaths were due to a bridge that was washed out. High waves washed away or damaged at least 65 boats. About 168,000 people were affected in the country. A total of 3 deaths were reported in Somalia as a result of the cyclone – all in Puntland. 50 deaths were reported in Somaliland.

In Djibouti, northwest of Somaliland, Sagar dropped a year's worth of rainfall, totaling 110 mm (4.3 in), which caused rivers to swell. Flooding damaged about 10,000 houses, with 2,000 of them severely damaged, which displaced 3,150 people. The rains flooded crops, streets, and buildings, catching residents off guard and killing at least two people. Infrastructure damage was estimated at US$30 million. In the Somali Region of eastern Ethiopia, Sagar produced strong winds and heavy rainfall, resulting in flooding and landslides. Near the border of SNNPR and Oromia, a landslide killed 23 people. The storm damaged schools, health facilities, and houses, displacing 194,000 people. The village of Dambal was almost entirely washed away, affecting 150 households.

== Aftermath ==
Following the storm's passage through Somalia, non-governmental organizations provided food, clothing, cash, blankets, and other emergency supplies. World Vision set up seven health clinics that treated hundreds of residents. Armed conflict in the Sool and Sanaag regions prevented humanitarian response from reaching affected residents who fled the violence and the storm. Somaliland's two main ports were damaged, which also disrupted humanitarian assistance. The Somaliland government provided meals to affected residents. The United Arab Emirates provided two helicopters for surveying isolated areas. The United Nations pledged $2.7 million to help rebuild and provide food and health services. With donations from multiple countries, the Somalia Humanitarian Fund helped restore schools, hospitals, and water supply. About $3.5 million was allocated to assist residents in the Awdal region. The World Food Programme supplied food to 36,000 people for a three-month period, although their efforts were initially hampered by poor road conditions. Save the Children Canada provided C$278,340 to rebuild and restore damaged water facilities. Norway sent kr30 million (US$3.7 million) to Somalia after Sagar, continuing the humanitarian assistance that the country began in 2017.

In Djibouti, the relief agency Caritas gave out food and clothing to affected residents. Final exams had to be postponed for 135,000 students after 16 schools were flooded. UNICEF provided water pumps to drain floodwaters from the schools, while the Djibouti Armed Forces assisted in clearing roads. Responding to the disaster, Japan's military base in the country donated food, blankets, and other emergency items.

The Ethiopian government provided food to affected residents in the eastern portion of their country who were affected by the storm.

== See also ==
- List of Horn of Africa tropical cyclones
- Cyclone Gati
- 2013 Somalia cyclone
