= List of Horn of Africa tropical cyclones =

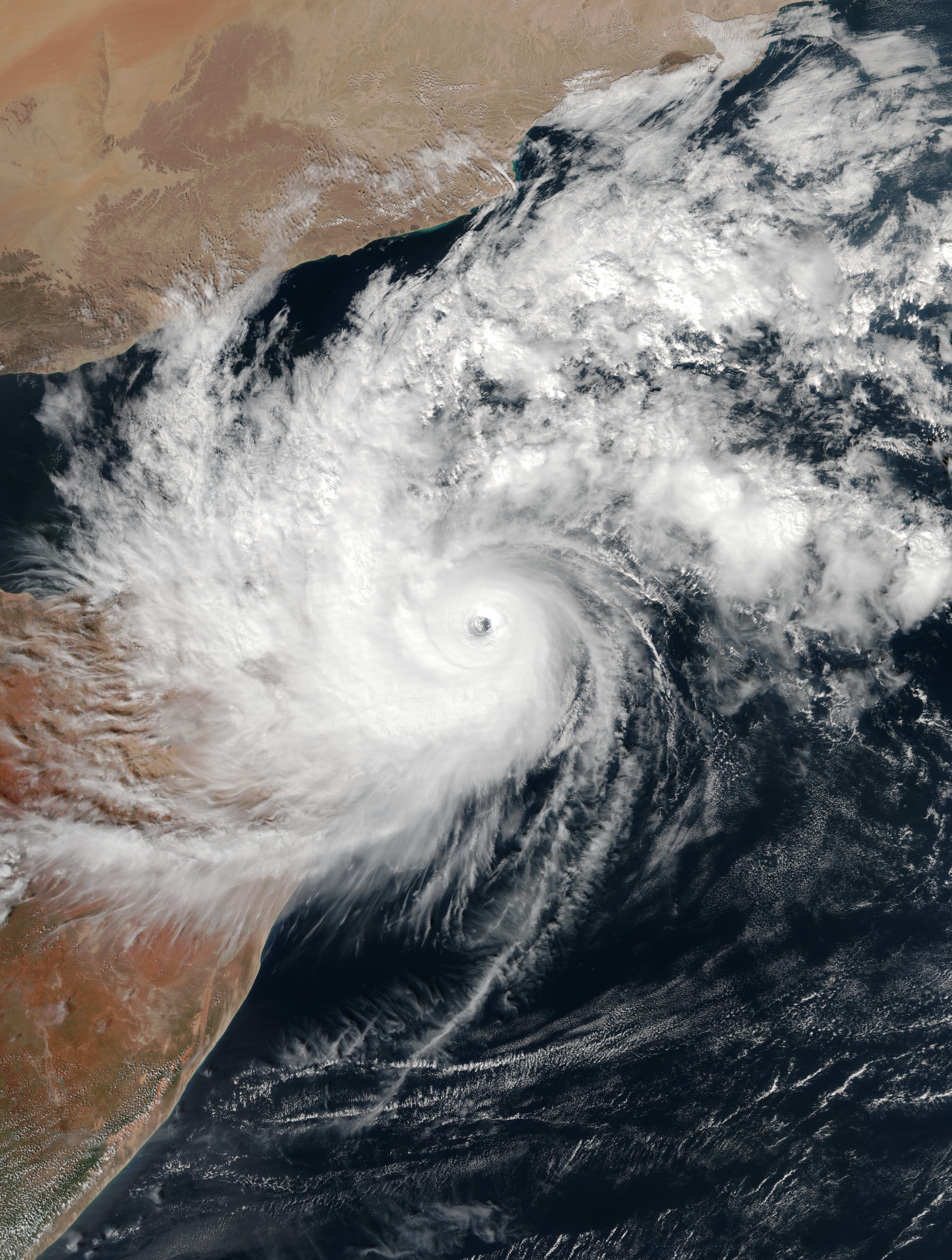
Cyclone Gati making landfall in Somalia. Gati broke Cyclone Sagar's record for the strongest storm to strike Somalia

The Horn of Africa has experienced the effects of 14 North Indian Ocean tropical cyclones since 1984, resulting in at least 108 fatalities. All but two of the storms struck Somalia from the east. The other two – a storm in May 1984 and Cyclone Sagar in May 2018 – traversed the Gulf of Aden and struck northern Somalia. Sagar killed 78 people in Somalia, Somaliland, Djibouti, and Ethiopia. In November 2013, a deep depression struck Somalia and killed 162 people while also causing extensive livestock damage. A storm in November 1994 killed 30 people in Somalia. The most recent storm to strike the region was Very Severe Cyclonic Storm Gati in November 2020.

== List of storms ==
- May 28, 1984 - After becoming the first documented tropical cyclone to move through the Gulf of Aden, a tropical storm struck about 65 km (40 mi) west of Berbera, Somalia and quickly dissipated.
- December 7, 1984 - A weak tropical cyclone struck eastern Somalia in Mudug province, and quickly dissipated.
- December 24, 1992 - A tropical storm in the southern Bari region, bringing beneficial rainfall to normally arid areas.
- November 20, 1994 - A cyclonic storm moved ashore eastern Somalia near Eyl, producing winds of 104 km/h (65 mph) in Bosaso. The storm's high winds and rainfall killed 30 people and injured hundreds others. Several boats and homes were washed away.
- November 9, 1997 - A weak tropical storm struck Puntland in northeastern Somalia, and quickly dissipated.
- December 4, 2004 - The remnants of Cyclone Agni moved southwestward along the Somalia coastline, dissipating just east of the capital Mogadishu.
- October 23, 2008 - A tropical depression moved through the Gulf of Aden before striking Yemen, bringing rainfall to Somalia and causing devastating floods in Yemen.
- October 25, 2012 - Cyclonic Storm Murjan struck the Bayla District of eastern Somalia, bringing heavy rainfall of over 40 mm (1.6 in) and gusty winds to the country and neighboring Ethiopia. Flash flooding washed away livestock and bridges in the Bari region, causing some fatalities.
- November 11, 2013 - A deep depression struck near the border of the Nugal and Bari regions and caused severe flash flooding. It was the deadliest tropical cyclone on record in Somalia, killing more than 162 people. The depression also destroyed over 1,000 houses, displaced tends of thousands of nomads, and killed millions of livestock.
- November 2, 2015 - Cyclone Chapala entered the Gulf of Aden as the strongest tropical cyclone on record. The storm dropped heavy rainfall in Puntland and Somaliland, killing over 25,000 animals and leaving thousands of people homeless, leaving some local nomadic tribes without any food.
- November 9, 2015 - Just days after Chapala, Cyclone Megh passed 57 km (36 mi) north of Cape Guardafui, Somalia, where it dropped heavy rainfall 300% of the annual average. Eyl reported 160 mm (6.3 in) of rainfall over 24 hours. Megh damaged roads, crops, and schools.

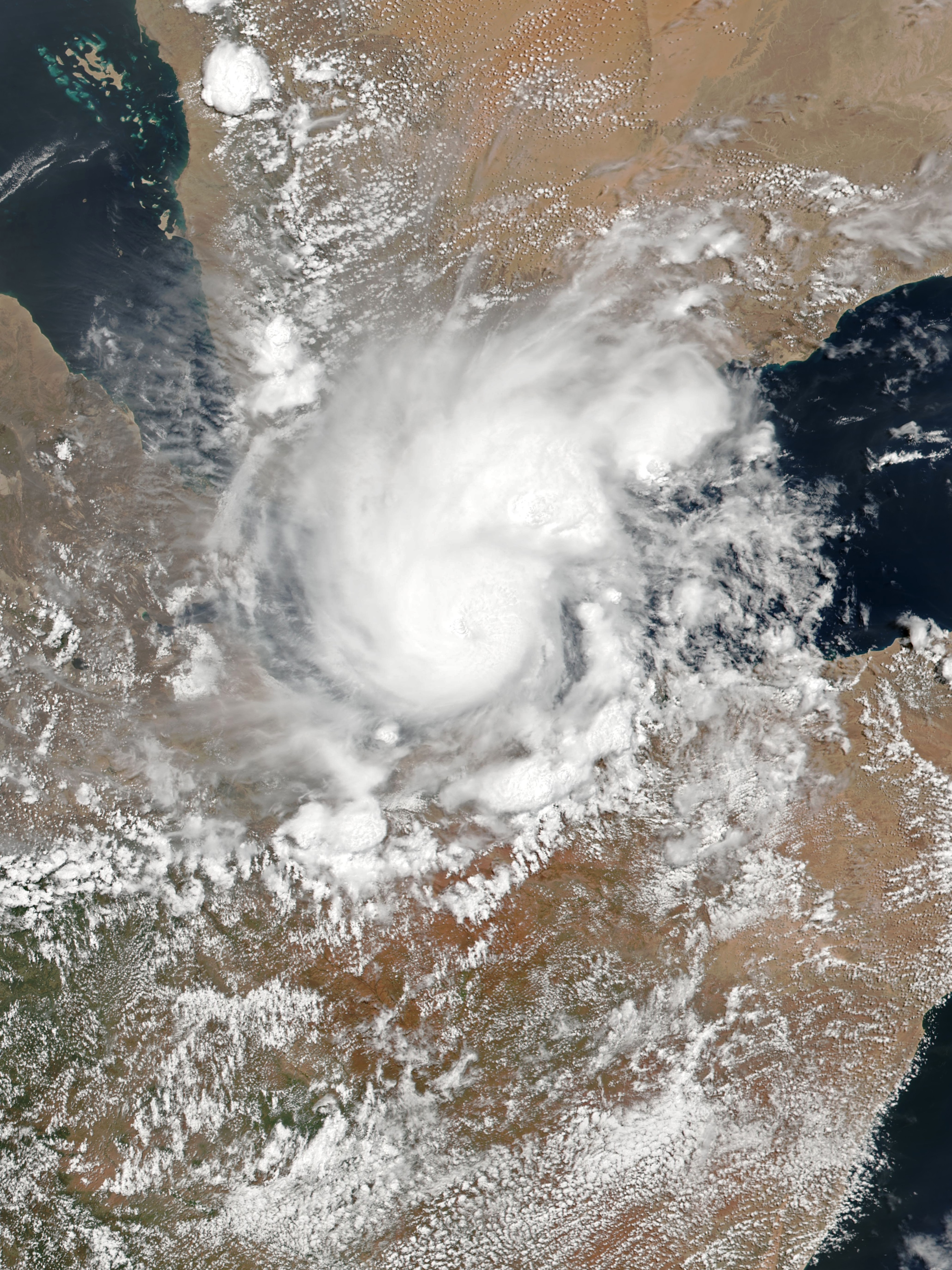
Satellite image of Cyclone Sagar, the strongest cyclone on record to strike Somalia until Gati in 2020, which also killed 78 people

- May 19, 2018 - After traversing much of the Gulf of Aden, Cyclone Sagar made the westernmost landfall in the northern Indian Ocean when it struck Lughaya in northwestern Somaliland with winds of 75 km/h (45 mph). The storm dropped a years' worth of rainfall in Somalia and neighboring Djibouti, reaching around 200 mm (7.9 in) near where it moved ashore. The storm caused flash flooding that carried away houses, bridges, and entire fields, leaving 5,640 people homeless. Sagar killed 3 in Puntland, 50 in Somaliland, and 2 in Djibouti. A landslide related to the storm killed 23 people in the Somali Region of eastern Ethiopia.
- October 15, 2018 - Cyclone Luban struck Yemen, and its outer fringes dropped rainfall in Puntland.
- December 7, 2019 - Cyclonic Storm Pawan made landfall in Somalia just south of Eyl with winds of around 65 mph (40 mph). The storm dropped heavy rainfall along the northeast Somali coast. Flash flooding killed six people. Pawan continued westward into Ethiopia and weakened.
- November 22–23, 2020 - Very Severe Cyclonic Storm Gati made landfall in northern Somalia, becoming the first hurricane-equivalent storm to hit the Horn of Africa.

== Climatological statistics ==
Storms affecting the Horn of Africa by month
Month	Number of storms
May	2
October	3
November	6
December	4

Storms affecting the Horn of Africa by period
Period	Number of storms
1980s	2
1990s	3
2000s	2
2010s	7
2020s	1

== See also ==
- List of Arabian Peninsula tropical cyclones
