= Deep Depression ARB 01 (2013) =

North Indian cyclone in 2013

Deep Depression ARB 01 2013 Somalia cyclone
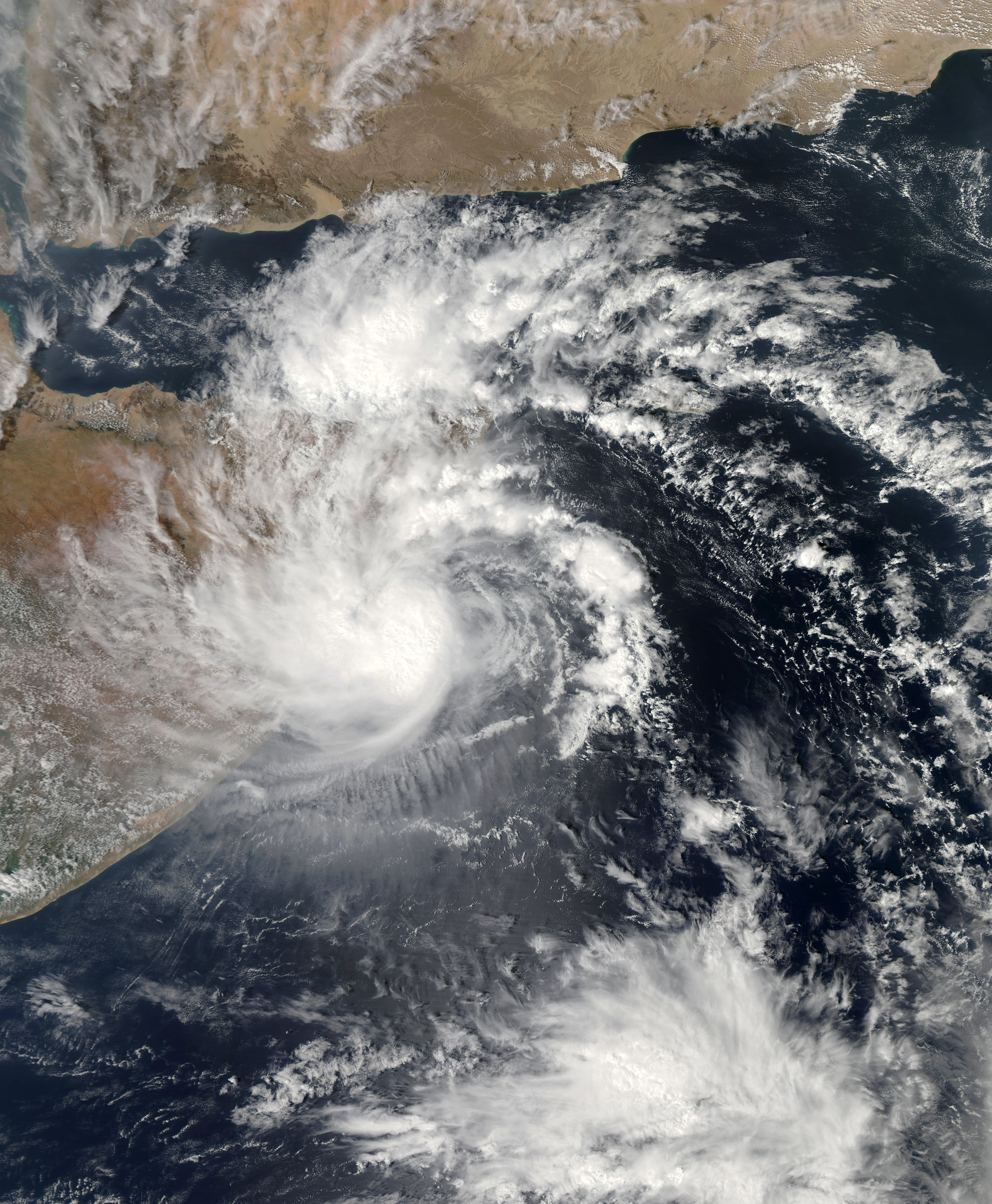
- ARB 01 just off the coast of Somalia on November 10

Meteorological history
- Formed: November 8, 2013
- Dissipated: November 11, 2013

Deep depression
- 3-minute sustained (IMD)
- Highest winds: 55 km/h (35 mph)
- Lowest pressure: 1002 hPa (mbar); 29.59 inHg

Tropical storm
- 1-minute sustained (SSHWS/JTWC)
- Highest winds: 85 km/h (50 mph)
- Lowest pressure: 989 hPa (mbar); 29.21 inHg

Overall effects
- Fatalities: 162
- Missing: 300
- Areas affected: Somalia (Puntland), Ethiopia
- IBTrACS
- Part of the 2013 North Indian Ocean cyclone season

Deep Depression ARB 01 was the second deadliest tropical cyclone worldwide in 2013 as well as the deadliest to affect Somalia in recorded history. The sixth tropical cyclone and third deep depression of the 2013 North Indian Ocean cyclone season, ARB 01 formed in the Arabian Sea on November 8. The cyclone subsequently strengthened into a deep depression before making landfall in the Puntland region of Somalia at peak intensity on November 11. After making landfall, the cyclone rapidly weakened over land and degenerated into a well-marked low-pressure area later on the same day.

Although the cyclone remained weak throughout its life, torrential rainfall associated with the system killed 162 people across Somalia, and left about 300 others missing.

== Meteorological history ==
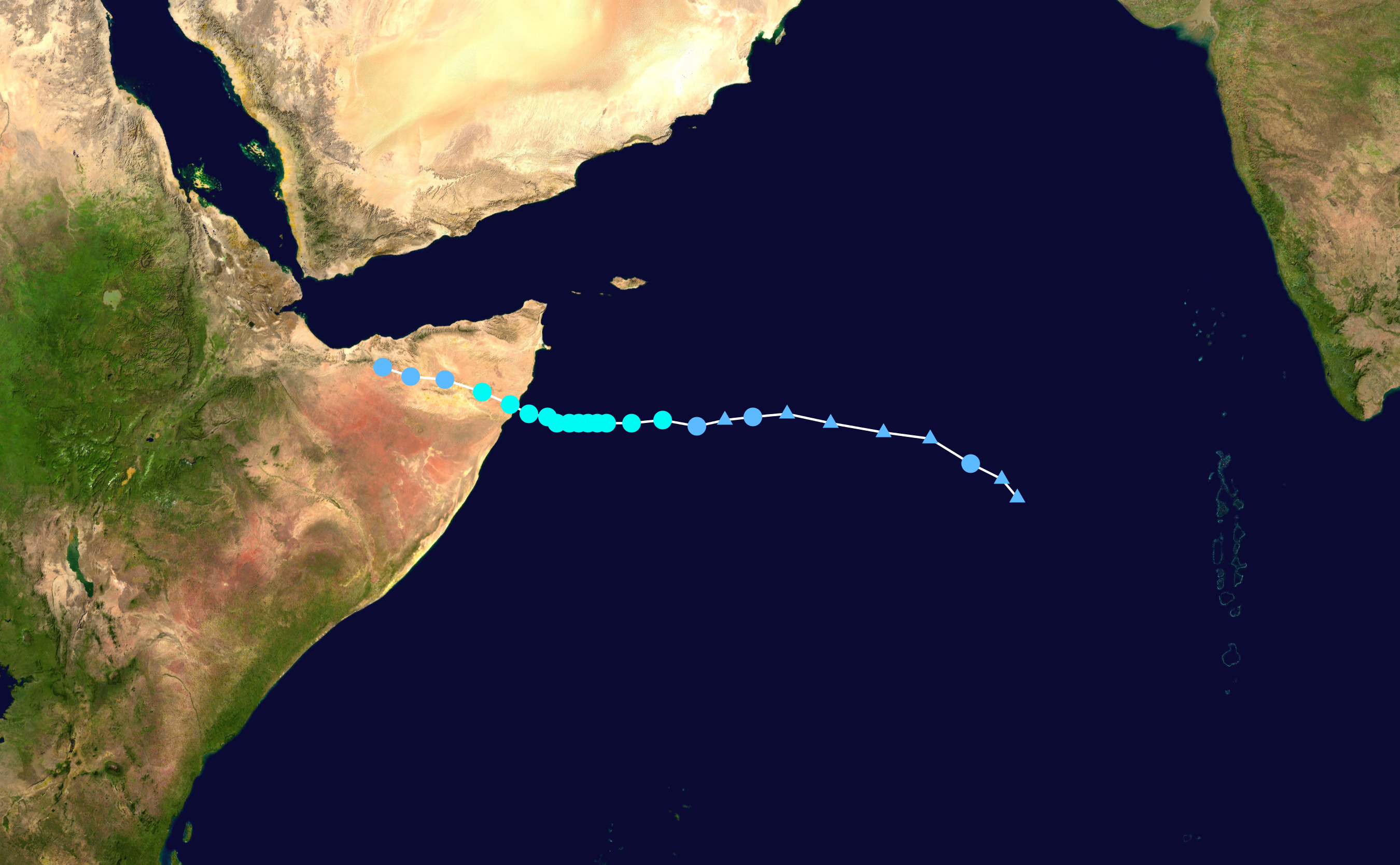
Map plotting the storm's track and intensity, according to the Saffir–Simpson scale Map key Saffir–Simpson scale Tropical depression (≤38 mph, ≤62 km/h) Tropical storm (39–73 mph, 63–118 km/h) Category 1 (74–95 mph, 119–153 km/h) Category 2 (96–110 mph, 154–177 km/h) Category 3 (111–129 mph, 178–208 km/h) Category 4 (130–156 mph, 209–251 km/h) Category 5 (≥157 mph, ≥252 km/h) Unknown Storm type Tropical cyclone Subtropical cyclone Extratropical cyclone, remnant low, tropical disturbance, or monsoon depression

On November 6, 2013, the Joint Typhoon Warning Center (JTWC) began monitoring a broad low-pressure area over the southeastern Arabian Sea. Accompanied by bursts of convective activity, the low tracked generally westward over an area slightly favoring tropical cyclogenesis. Moderate wind shear offset the positive effects of upper-level outflow, though high sea surface temperatures aided further development. By November 8, organized banding features wrapped around the northwestern side of a consolidating circulation. Subsequently, the India Meteorological Department (IMD) classified the disturbance as Depression ARB 01 at 1000 UTC, making it the first tropical cyclone in the Arabian Sea during 2013. At this time, the depression was located about 680 km (425 mi) east-southeast of Ras Binnah, Somalia. Based on continued development, the JTWC issued a Tropical Cyclone Formation Alert two hours later before declaring the system as Tropical Cyclone 03A at 2100 UTC. A subtropical ridge to the north steered the system on a westward course that would bring it over Somalia in two days. Some limited intensification was anticipated, though the JTWC also noted the potential for dissipation before landfall.

Early on November 9, an Advanced Microwave Sounding Unit pass of the system revealed a mid-level eye feature, indicative of an intensifying system; however, scatterometer data showed little changes in intensity. Around this time, IMD assessed the system to have intensified into a deep depression and attained its peak intensity, with three-minute sustained winds of 55 km/h (35 mph) and a barometric pressure of 1002 mbar (hPa; 29.59 inHg). The JTWC estimated the system to have been slightly stronger at peak intensity, with one-minute sustained winds of 75 km/h (45 mph). Continued moderate wind shear displaced most convection to the northwest of the center of circulation, counteracting the favorable poleward outflow prevailing over the cyclone. The wind shear took its toll by November 10, leaving the storm's center devoid of showers and thunderstorms. More pronounced decay took place later in the day as the storm neared the coastline, with land interaction disrupting the circulation. Between 2300 UTC on November 10 and 0000 UTC on November 11, the deep depression made landfall along the border of the Nugal and Bari regions; the JTWC issued its final warning on the system shortly after landfall. According to the JTWC, the system was only the fifth known tropical storm to make landfall in Somalia since the start of accurate satellite measurements in 1966. Although it retained some organized convection, the system gradually weakened as it moved inland; it was last noted by the IMD later on November 11 as it neared Ethiopia.

== Preparations and impact ==
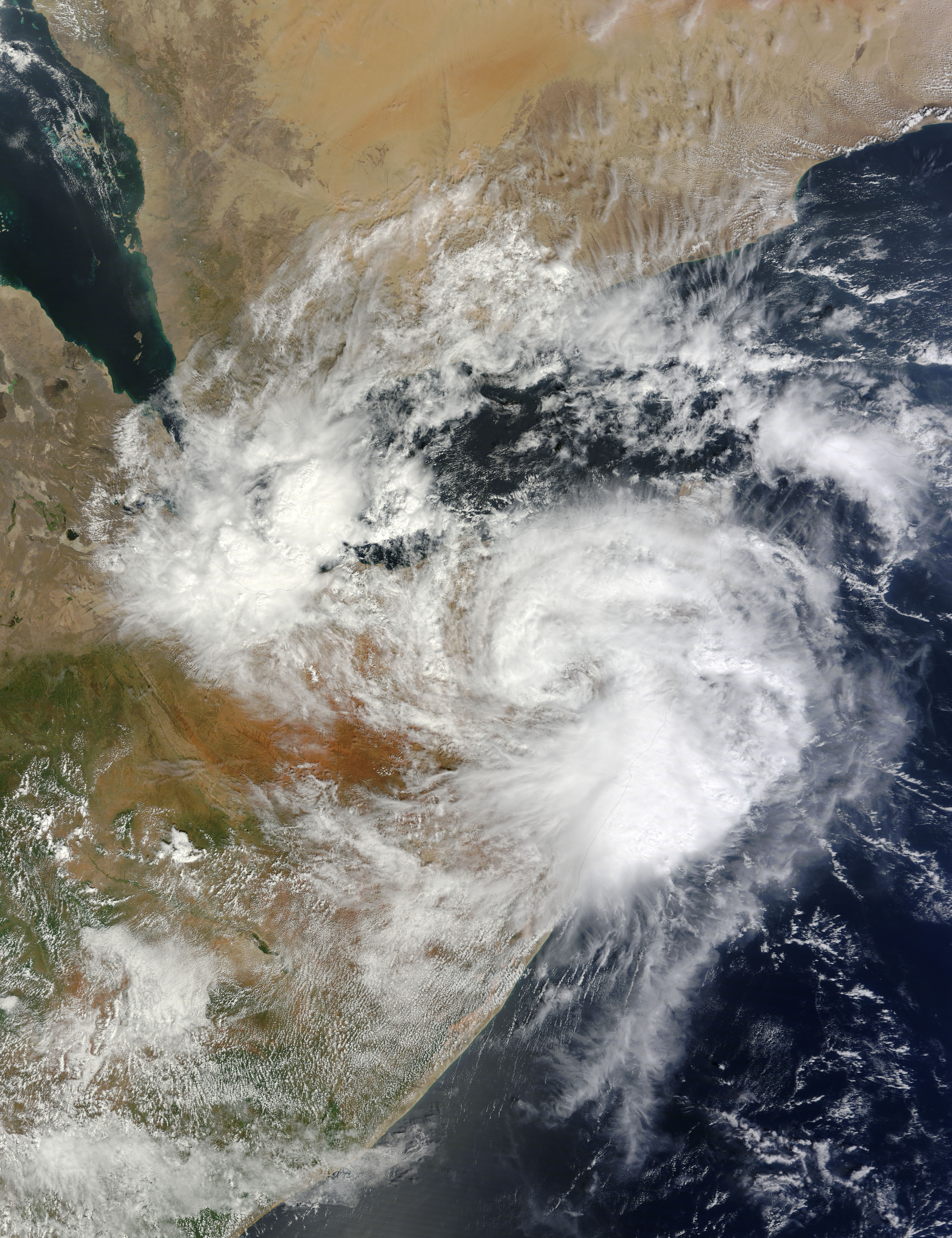
ARB 01 after landfall on November 11

On November 9, Puntland's Interior Minister Ali Yusuf Ali Hosh announced on Radio Garowe that the Puntland authorities had been informed by international meteorological agencies that flood-inducing cyclones were expected to hit Somalia's northeastern coast. The Puntland government concurrently firmed up on its surveillance system, alerting regional authorities, fishermen and other civilians of the impending tropical storm through the local media and via text messages.

The cyclone primarily impacted the Alula, Bayla, Dangorayo, Eyl and Hafun districts. Up to 350 mm (14 in) of rainfall was registered, around 100 mm (3.9 in) more than the average regional amount per year. According to the Puntland government, 162 fatalities were confirmed while an additional 300 people were listed as missing. Of 650 medical consultations, around 80 deaths were confirmed from hypothermia and exposure, mainly of children and the elderly.

According to the Puntland Disaster Management and Rescue committee, the torrential rains inundated littoral towns and faraway rural areas at a higher level than expected. A number of bridges, villages, buildings, homes and boats were destroyed during the storm. Photos taken by Puntland Maritime Police Force (PMPF) units using special boats captured images of submerged dirt roads between urban and rural areas, as well as debris from flattened houses and fallen trees that was blocking off parts of the Bosaso–Galkayo highway. Additionally, in part due to icy rain, around 100,000 livestock died. Regular flights to and from the Bender Qasim International Airport in Bosaso and the Abdullahi Yusuf International Airport in Galkayo were also affected by the cyclone's torrential rains, and the airports' gravel runways sustained some damage. Mobile phone masts were likewise destroyed, and electricity was interrupted.

== Aftermath ==
The Puntland government established a Puntland Disaster Management and Rescue committee to oversee local relief efforts in the wake of the cyclone. Puntland Maritime Police Force units and government rescue teams were also deployed to the impacted areas. PMPF troops assisted in the transportation of emergency supplies, including blankets, tents, non-perishable food items and medicines. Accessibility to the most affected areas was slowed by flash floods and the collapse of a bridge linking Bosaso with the administrative capital Garowe. Government rescue teams consequently utilized donkey carts to reach remote localities. The Puntland Highway Authority (PHA) also established an alternative land route for trucks transporting relief materials. In total, the Puntland government sent 32 trucks carrying supplies to the affected areas.

Along with the Puntland regional authorities, the Federal Government of Somalia declared a state of emergency in the cyclone struck areas. It also indicated that $1 million would be earmarked for the impacted communities. In addition, the Somaliland regional administration in northwestern Somalia pledged to provide humanitarian assistance. Neighboring Djibouti and Ethiopia also dispatched relief shipments.

According to OCHA, strong coordination between the Puntland government and humanitarian agencies led to an effective emergency response for the nearly 30,000 people affected by the cyclone. The UN World Food Programme sent 340 tons in food rations, intended to sustain around 4,000 impacted households for one month. The International Federation of the Red Cross likewise treated 757 individuals for acute respiratory infections and skin-related diseases over three days, and recommended that clean drinking water be made available to the impacted areas to avert waterborne illnesses like diarrhoea. In conjunction with the Somali authorities, the Qatar Alliance led by the Qatar Red Crescent also distributed essential supplies to around 1,000 impacted families.

By November 25, focus had shifted to rebuilding lost livelihoods, including the restocking of livestock. To this end, the Puntland government distributed around 15,887 heads of livestock in December to hundreds of pastoralist households affected by the storm. According to Puntland officials, the Bosaso and Galkayo airports' runways were also undergoing repair work.

== See also ==
- List of Horn of Africa tropical cyclones
- 2008 Yemen cyclone
- 2015 North Indian Ocean cyclone season
- 2015 Myanmar flood
- Cyclone Sagar
