= Cyclone Gati =

North Indian Ocean cyclone in 2020

Very Severe Cyclonic Storm Gati
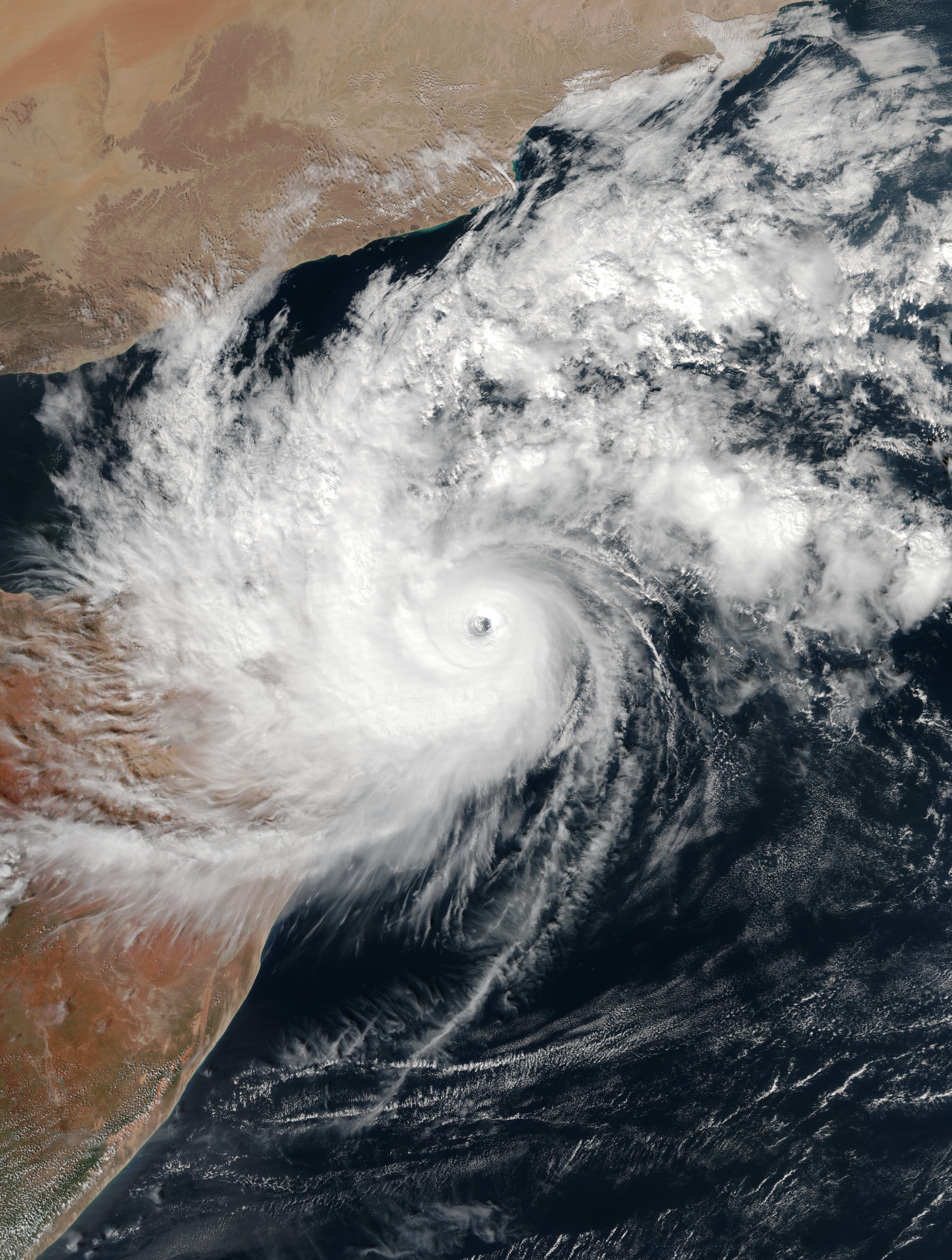
- Cyclone Gati shortly after peak intensity approaching Somalia on 22 November

Meteorological history
- Formed: 21 November 2020
- Dissipated: 24 November 2020

Very severe cyclonic storm
- 3-minute sustained (IMD)
- Highest winds: 140 km/h (85 mph)
- Lowest pressure: 976 hPa (mbar); 28.82 inHg

Category 3-equivalent tropical cyclone
- 1-minute sustained (SSHWS/JTWC)
- Highest winds: 185 km/h (115 mph)
- Lowest pressure: 967 hPa (mbar); 28.56 inHg

Overall effects
- Fatalities: 9 confirmed
- Missing: 30
- Damage: Unknown
- Areas affected: Somalia, Yemen
- IBTrACS
- Part of the 2020 North Indian Ocean cyclone season

Very Severe Cyclonic Storm Gati (Note: The name Gati (Hindi: गति; [ɡɐ.tiː]) was contributed by India and means "motion, speed" in Hindi.) was the strongest tropical cyclone on record to make landfall in Somalia, and one of few tropical cyclones to do so in the country. The seventh depression, third cyclonic storm, and second very severe cyclonic storm of the 2020 North Indian Ocean cyclone season, Gati formed from an area of low pressure in the Arabian Sea, on 21 November. The storm then explosively intensified, becoming a very severe tropical cyclone and reaching its peak intensity, the following day. Gati weakened slightly before making landfall in northeastern Somalia on 22 November. Gati was the first hurricane-force cyclone to make landfall in Somalia on record. Gati then weakened and became disorganized as it moved inland. The JTWC issued its final advisory on Gati shortly after it moved into the Gulf of Aden on 23 November.

Gati caused heavy rainfall over Somalia, peaking at 128 mm (5.0 in) in Bosaso. An estimated 10,000 animals were killed by Gati in Ufeyn. The storm killed at least 9 people and displaced approximately 42,000 others in the country and caused millions of dollars in damages. Minor impacts were also observed on the Yemeni island of Socotra and in the Ethiopian Highlands.

== Meteorological history ==
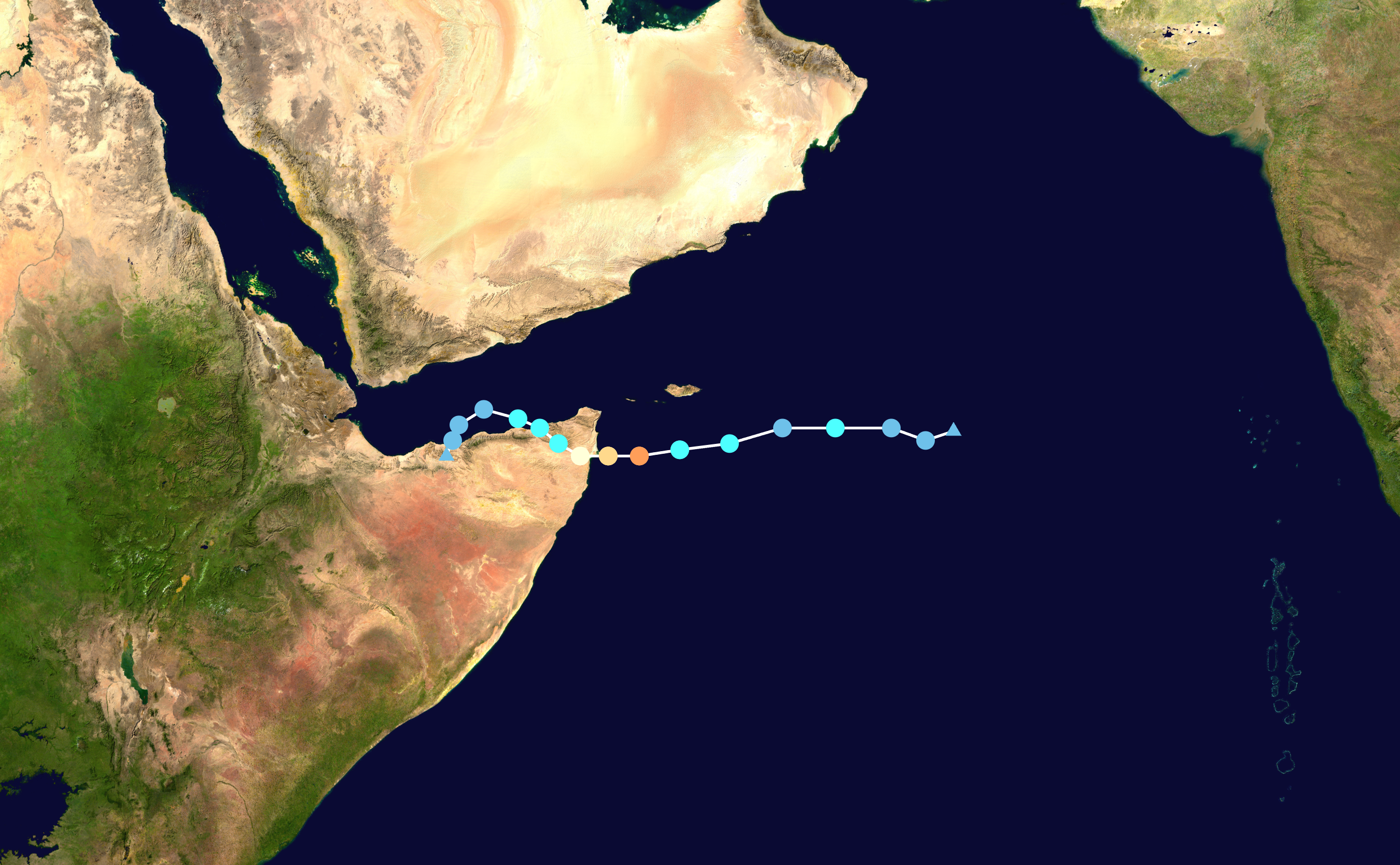
Map plotting the storm's track and intensity, according to the Saffir–Simpson scale Map key Saffir–Simpson scale Tropical depression (≤38 mph, ≤62 km/h) Tropical storm (39–73 mph, 63–118 km/h) Category 1 (74–95 mph, 119–153 km/h) Category 2 (96–110 mph, 154–177 km/h) Category 3 (111–129 mph, 178–208 km/h) Category 4 (130–156 mph, 209–251 km/h) Category 5 (≥157 mph, ≥252 km/h) Unknown Storm type Tropical cyclone Subtropical cyclone Extratropical cyclone, remnant low, tropical disturbance, or monsoon depression

On 17 November 2020, the India Meteorological Department (IMD) noted the potential for tropical cyclogenesis over the central Arabian Sea in association with an area of convection near the Maldives. Convective activity was enhanced by the Madden–Julian oscillation while sea surface temperatures of 29 to 30 °C (84 to 86 °F) and low wind shear favored additional development. By 18 November, a weak low-level circulation developed about 1,185 km (736 mi) east-southeast of Socotra. Organization thereafter was stymied as it became embedded within a monsoon trough. Two additional circulations developed to the east and west of the original low; however, the original low steadily became the dominant system by absorbing the previous two circulations. On 21 November, two scatterometer passes revealed a single, well-defined low with gale-force winds underneath an area of flaring convection. At 18:00 UTC, the IMD classified the system as Depression ARB 04 about 410 km (250 mi) east-southeast of Socotra. Similarly, the Joint Typhoon Warning Center (JTWC) initiated advisories on the system as Tropical Cyclone 03A. Steered west by a subtropical ridge to the north, little intensification was expected before the cyclone's forecast landfall in Somalia.

During the overnight of 21 to 22 November the small cyclone quickly organized, with a well-defined eye developing. The IMD upgraded the system to a deep depression early on 22 November and a cyclonic storm soon after. Upon becoming a cyclonic storm, it was assigned the name Gati. Classified as a "midget system" by the JTWC with a core diameter of only 120 km (75 mi) and a 27 km (17 mi) wide eye, Gati explosively intensified that morning, with 1-minute maximum sustained winds increasing from 110 to 185 km/h (70 to 115 mph) in only six hours. The IMD assessed Gati to have reached its peak intensity as a Very Severe Cyclonic Storm around 12:00 UTC, with three-minute sustained winds of 140 km/h (85 mph) and a minimum pressure of 976 hPa (28.82 inHg). Six hours later, Gati had made landfall near Hafun in northeastern Somalia with estimated one-minute sustained winds of 165 km/h (105 mph). This made Gati the first hurricane-force cyclone to strike the country since reliable records began and by default the nation's strongest.

Once onshore, land friction-based shear caused convection to quickly become displaced from the storm's center. The low-level circulation became completely exposed early on 23 November as it traversed northeastern Somalia; the system's upper-level circulation and associated convection detached and accelerated west ahead of the surface low. The increasingly elongated circulation of Gati emerged over the Gulf of Aden by 12:00 UTC, and the JTWC issued their final advisory on the system shortly thereafter.

== Preparations and impact ==
Cyclone Gati caused extensive damage in Somalia, displacing thousands, killing 9, and worsening locusts swarms in the region. Although no specific number is out, damage from Gati is expected to be in the millions.

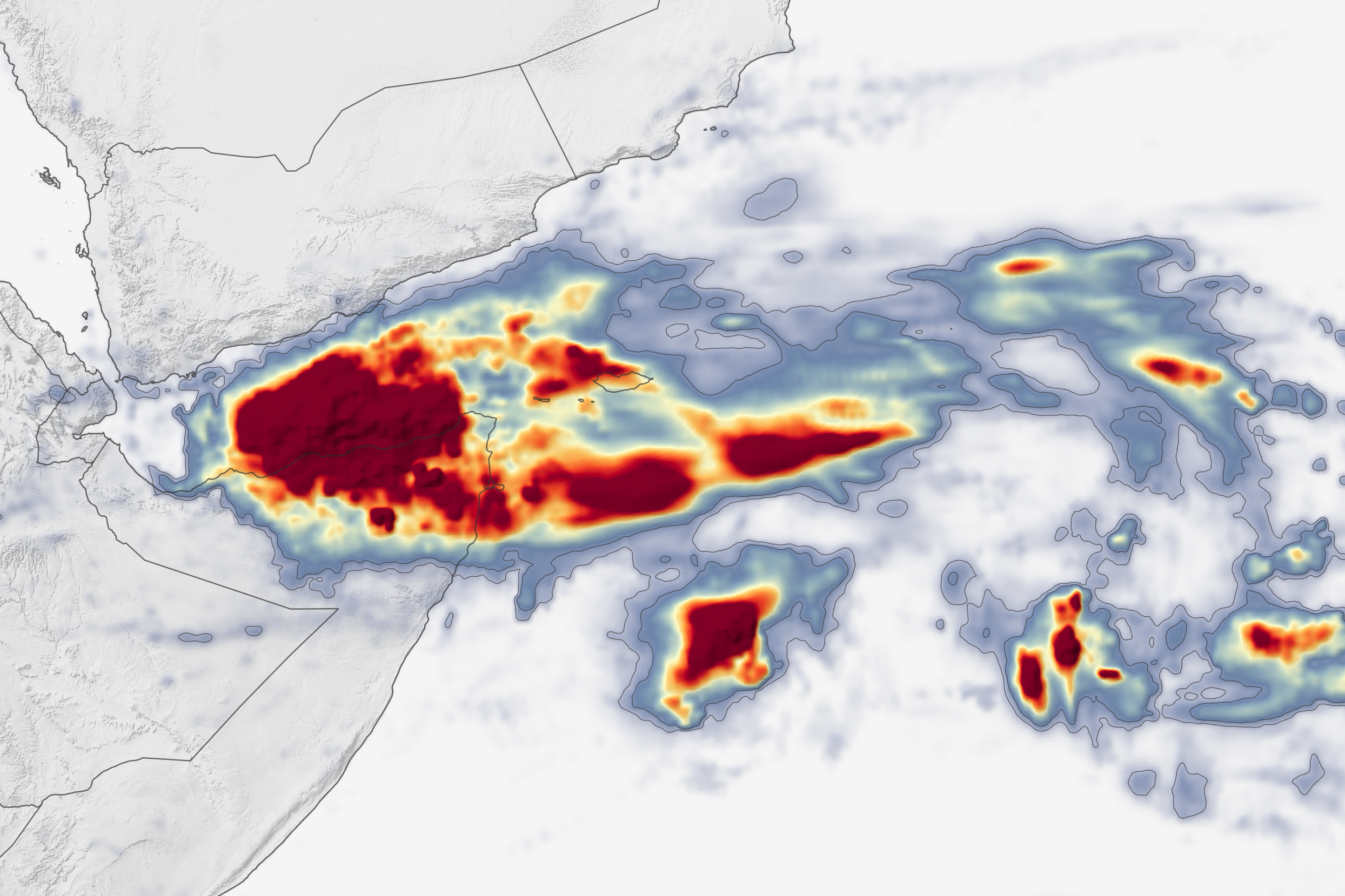
A map of satellite derived rainfall estimates from the Global Precipitation Measurement between 21 and 23 November 2020. The darkest shades of red indicate accumulations in excess of 100 mm (4 in).

=== Somalia ===
Northern Somalia, the area most heavily impacted, normally sees 100 mm (4 in) of rain annually. Cyclone Gati was forecast to produce twice this amount in two days. A joint warning by the Somalia Water and Land Information Management and United Nations Food and Agriculture Organization warned for the potential of strong winds, heavy rainfall, and flash flooding in the Puntland region. Evacuations took place in coastal areas of Bari. Concerns over food security were raised by the United Nations as the storm "compounded an already fragile humanitarian situation" stemming from a drought in 2017. In Somaliland, the National Disaster Preparedness and Food Reserve Authority alerted residents of the storm and placed the coast guard on standby for possible evacuations.

Torrential rains, damaging winds, and storm surge impacted areas of northern Somalia, primarily in Puntland. 24-hour rainfall totals reached 128 mm (5.0 in) in Bosaso and 103 mm (4.1 in) in the Balidhidhin District. Extensive damage occurred in Bari, with at least 642 homes destroyed and communication lost with several communities. An estimated 180,000 people were directly affected by the cyclone, including 42,000 who were displaced from their homes. Freshwater wells in Hafun, Taageer, and Qandala were inundated by flooding. At least six people were injured in Hafun, including district commissioner Mohamud Yusuf Garow, due to collapsing buildings. At least 8 fishermen were killed off the coast of Hafun while 30 others remain missing. Farther inland, the desert communities of Ashira and Hordio were directly impacted by the cyclone's core. An estimated 10,000 animals were killed in Ufeyn. In Sanaag, roughly 950 heads of livestock were killed by Gati. Flooding in Bosaso disrupted transportation. A bridge was damaged between the towns of Maydh and Heis.

In Somaliland to the west, rainfall was lighter and no damage was reported. Accumulations peaked at 60 mm (2.4 in) in Badhan and 35 mm (1.4 in) in Erigavo.

=== Elsewhere ===
Gati dropped heavy rainfall which produced flash flooding over the Yemeni island of Socotra. Heavy rainfall fell across the Ethiopian Highlands from the remnants of Gati.

== Aftermath ==
On 23 November, Puntland's government convened to discuss recovery operations related to Cyclone Gati, and later requested humanitarian assistance. An estimated 66,000 people required "direct humanitarian assistance". Initial efforts were hindered by limited access to water, sanitation, and hygiene supplies in Bossaso. Requests were made to transport WASH supplies from Mogadishu, a process that normally takes ten days, with the United Nations Office for the Coordination of Humanitarian Affairs (OCHA) working with Puntland to expedite the process. By 26 November, 3,000 hygiene kits were distributed to about 9,000 people in Bossaso. United Nations Health and Nutrition Cluster partners mobilized clinics to aid 10,000 households across Bossaso, Hafun, Hurdiya, and Iskushuban. The Emergency Shelter and Non-Food Items (NFI) Cluster distributed 500 NFI kits and US$245,000 in funds for additional items and shelter.

The United Nations Food and Agriculture Organization noted that heavy rains from the cyclone could exacerbate ongoing desert locust swarms in south/central Somalia and eastern Ethiopia. This soon came true as breeding began in places that had received rains from Gati by December 2020.

== See also ==
- Tropical cyclones in 2020
- List of Horn of Africa tropical cyclones
- Cyclone Sagar (2018) – Also impacted Somalia and Socotra
