= Cyclone Chapala =

North Indian cyclone in 2015

Extremely Severe Cyclonic Storm Chapala
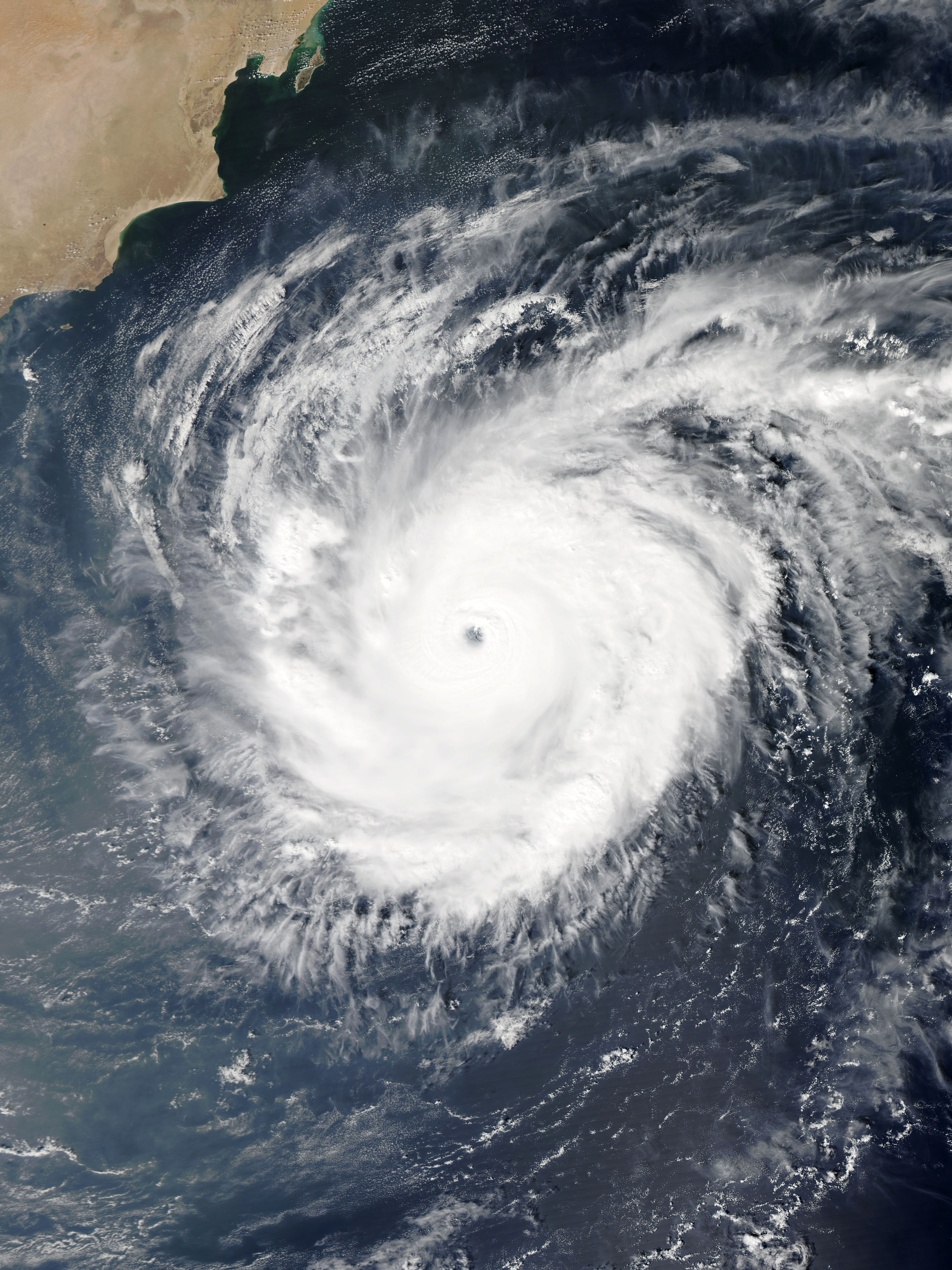
- Cyclone Chapala at peak intensity to the southeast of the coast of Oman on 30 October

Meteorological history
- Formed: 28 October 2015
- Dissipated: 4 November 2015

Extremely severe cyclonic storm
- 3-minute sustained (IMD)
- Highest winds: 215 km/h (130 mph)
- Lowest pressure: 940 hPa (mbar); 27.76 inHg

Category 4-equivalent tropical cyclone
- 1-minute sustained (SSHWS)
- Highest winds: 240 km/h (150 mph)
- Lowest pressure: 926 hPa (mbar); 27.34 inHg

Overall effects
- Fatalities: 8 total
- Damage: >$100 million (2015 USD)
- Areas affected: Oman, Somalia, Yemen
- IBTrACS
- Part of the 2015 North Indian Ocean cyclone season

Extremely Severe Cyclonic Storm Chapala (Note: The name Chapala (Bengali: চপলা; [ˈt͡ʃɔpɔlaˑ]) was contributed by Bangladesh and means "thunderbolt" in Bengali.) was a powerful tropical cyclone that caused moderate damage in Somalia and Yemen during November 2015. Chapala was the third named storm of the 2015 North Indian Ocean cyclone season. It developed as a depression on 28 October off western India, and strengthened a day later into a cyclonic storm. Chapala then rapidly intensified amid favorable conditions. On 30 October, the India Meteorological Department (IMD) (Note: The India Meteorological Department is the official Regional Specialized Meteorological Center for the northern Indian Ocean.) estimated that Chapala attained peak three-minute sustained winds of 215 km/h (135 mph). The American-based Joint Typhoon Warning Center (JTWC) (Note: The Joint Typhoon Warning Center is a joint United States Navy – United States Air Force task force that issues tropical cyclone warnings for the Indian Ocean and other regions.) estimated sustained winds of 240 km/h (150 mph), making Chapala among the strongest cyclones on record in the Arabian Sea. After peak intensity, Chapala skirted the Yemeni island of Socotra on 1 November, becoming the first hurricane-force storm there since 1922. High winds and heavy rainfall resulted in an island-wide power outage, and severe damage was compounded by Cyclone Megh, which struck Yemen a week later.

While Chapala encountered less favorable conditions after passing Socotra, it maintained much of its intensity; upon entering the Gulf of Aden on 2 November, it became the strongest known cyclone in that body of water. Chapala brushed the northern coast of Somalia, killing tens of thousands of animals and wrecking 350 houses. Ahead of the cyclone's final landfall, widespread evacuations occurred across southeastern Yemen, including in areas controlled by al-Qaeda, amid the country's ongoing civil war. Early on 3 November, the storm made landfall near Mukalla, Yemen, as a very severe cyclonic storm and the strongest storm on record to strike the nation. Chapala weakened into a remnant low the next day overland. Several years' worth of heavy rainfall inundated coastal areas, damaging roads and hundreds of homes. Eight people died in Yemen, a low total credited to the evacuations, and another 65 were injured. After cyclones Chapala and Megh, several countries, non-government organizations, and agencies within the United Nations provided monetary and material assistance to Yemen. The country faced food and fuel shortages, and residual storm effects contributed to an outbreak of locusts and dengue fever, the latter of which killed seven people.

== Meteorological history ==
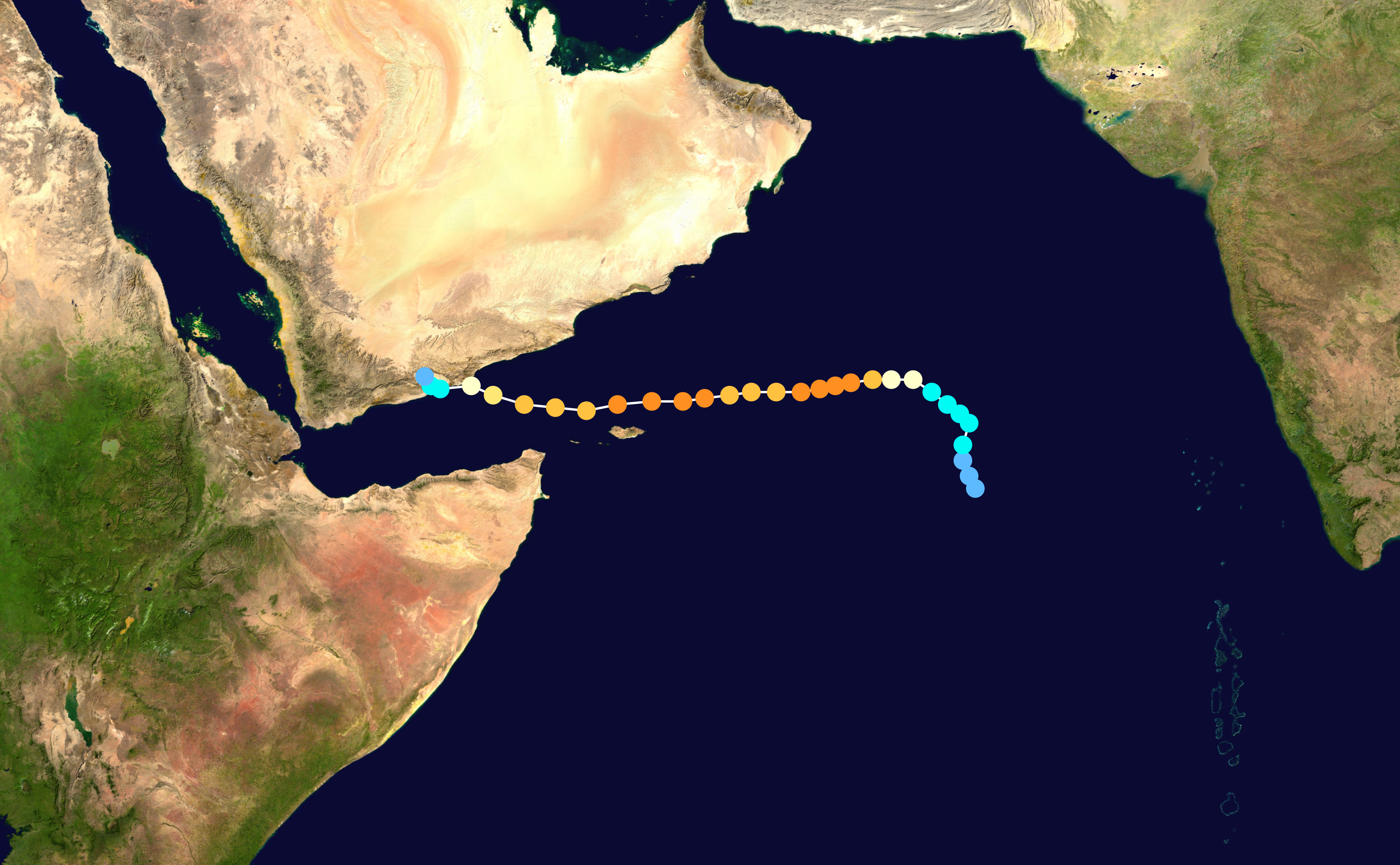
Map plotting the storm's track and intensity, according to the Saffir–Simpson scale Map key Saffir–Simpson scale Tropical depression (≤38 mph, ≤62 km/h) Tropical storm (39–73 mph, 63–118 km/h) Category 1 (74–95 mph, 119–153 km/h) Category 2 (96–110 mph, 154–177 km/h) Category 3 (111–129 mph, 178–208 km/h) Category 4 (130–156 mph, 209–251 km/h) Category 5 (≥157 mph, ≥252 km/h) Unknown Storm type Tropical cyclone Subtropical cyclone Extratropical cyclone, remnant low, tropical disturbance, or monsoon depression

The monsoon trough spawned a fragmented area of convection, or thunderstorms, southwest of India on 25 October, 2015. The system was located within an environment of moderate wind shear, which prevented early development but decreased over time. On 26 October, the system developed a distinct low-pressure area, which gradually became better defined, with good outflow to the north and south. At 03:00 UTC on 28 October, the India Meteorological Department (IMD) designated the system as a depression. Nine hours later, the agency upgraded it to a deep depression, and the Joint Typhoon Warning Center (JTWC) classified the system as Tropical Cyclone 04A at 21:00 UTC.

The deep depression moved slowly to the north at first, steered by an anticyclone to the northeast. The IMD upgraded the system to a cyclonic storm at 00:00 UTC on 29 October, giving it the name Chapala. Around the same time, the storm turned towards the west, influenced by another anticyclone to its northwest. With low wind shear, as well as record-warm 30 °C (86 °F) water temperatures, Chapala began a 33-hour period of rapid deepening, in which the barometric pressure dropped 59 hPa (1.74 inHg). The storm developed well-defined rainbands and thunderstorms that consolidated into an eye feature. The JTWC estimated Chapala attained hurricane-force winds of 120 km/h (75 mph) at 12:00 UTC on 29 October. Meanwhile, the IMD upgraded Chapala to a severe cyclonic storm at 09:00 UTC that day, and further to a very severe cyclonic storm at 18:00 UTC. By early on 30 October, Chapala had developed a well-defined eye 22 km (14 mi) wide. Based on satellite intensity estimates using the Dvorak technique, the JTWC assessed Chapala as a high-end Category 4-equivalent cyclone on the Saffir–Simpson hurricane wind scale at 06:00 UTC with one-minute sustained winds of 240 km/h (150 mph). (Note: The Joint Typhoon Warning Center estimated winds of 250 km/h (155 mph) while the storm was active, but lowered it in a post-season analysis.) Based on their estimate, Chapala was the second-strongest cyclone on record over the Arabian Sea; at the time, only Cyclone Gonu of 2007 was stronger, and Cyclone Kyarr tied it in 2019. Meanwhile, the IMD upgraded Chapala to an extremely severe cyclonic storm at 00:00 UTC on 30 October and estimated peak three-minute sustained winds of 215 km/h (135 mph) at 09:00 UTC. The agency estimated a minimum central pressure of 940 hPa (27.76 inHg).

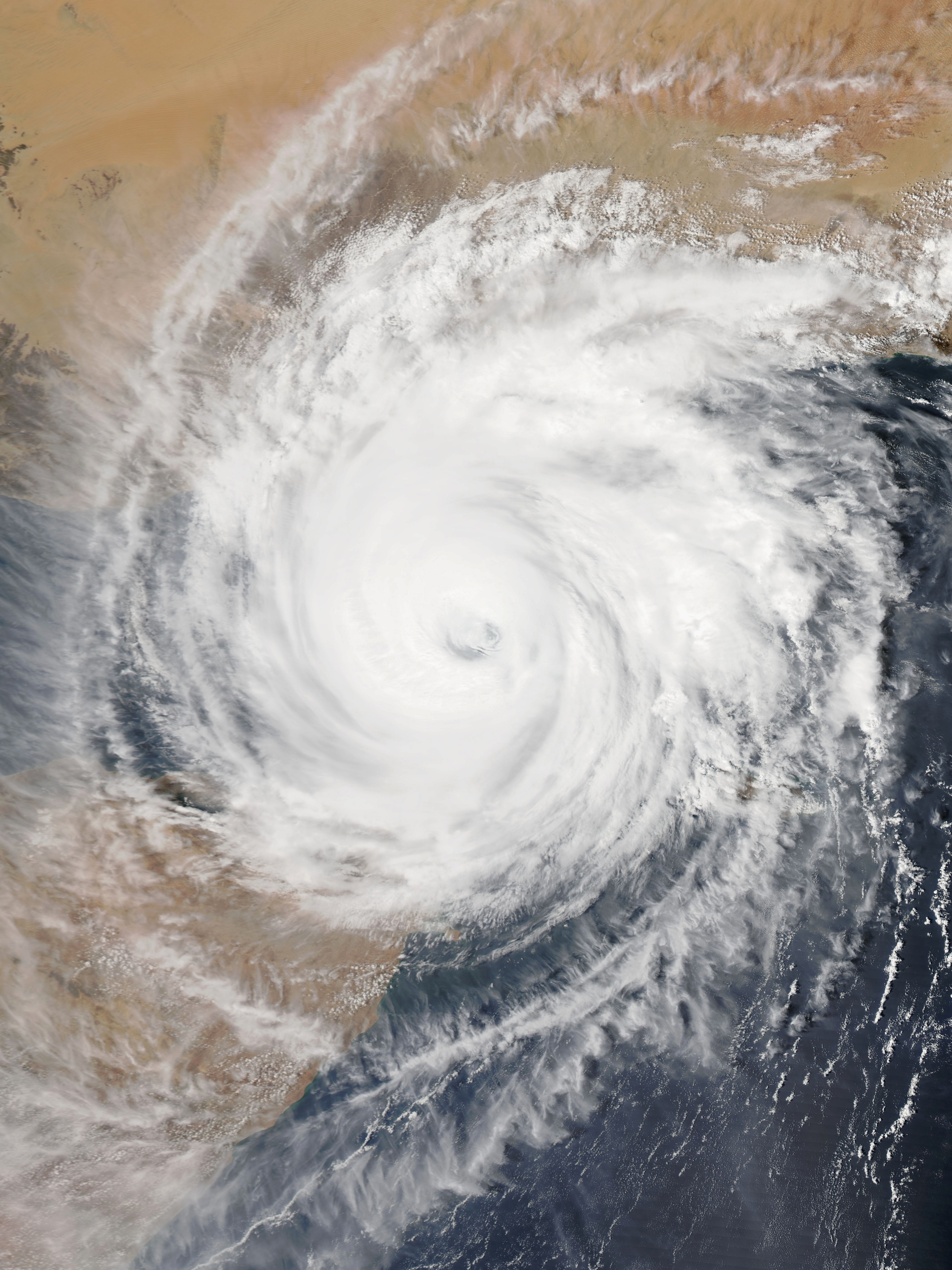
Chapala approaching Yemen on 2 November

At the time of peak intensity, Chapala was moving to the west-southwest due to a ridge to the north. Initially, the IMD forecast that Chapala would intensify further into a super cyclonic storm, and the JTWC anticipated it strengthening into a Category 5-equivalent. Instead, the storm began an eyewall replacement cycle on 30 October, causing the inner eyewall to degrade and an outer eyewall to form; this resulted in a slight drop in intensity. As well, drier air began affecting the storm, causing the thunderstorms around the eye to diminish. Chapala maintained much of its intensity due to strong outflow in all directions, especially to the northeast due to a tropical upper tropospheric trough over India, despite increased wind shear. The new eyewall became established on 31 October, reaching a diameter of 37 km (23 mi), although the thunderstorms around the eye continued to weaken. On 1 November, Chapala passed just north of the island of Socotra, marking the island's first hurricane-force impact since 1922.

After the cyclone passed Socotra, its convective core became better-defined due to improved outflow. Chapala entered the Gulf of Aden on 2 November, becoming the strongest tropical cyclone on record in that region. At 12:00 UTC that day, the IMD downgraded the system to a very severe cyclonic storm, after Chapala had been an extremely severe cyclonic storm for 78 hours. The structure became disorganized due to increased easterly wind shear and interaction with the Arabian Peninsula to the north, allowing cooler and drier air to enter the circulation. Around this time, the storm began moving more to the west-northwest toward Yemen, rounding the southwestern periphery of a ridge. Between 01:00–02:00 UTC on 3 November, Chapala made landfall near Mukalla with winds of 120 km/h (75 mph). This marked the first Yemeni hurricane-intensity landfall on record, and the first severe cyclonic storm to hit the country since May 1960. The center straddled the coast before heading inland. Chapala quickly weakened over land, degenerating into a depression by 00:00 UTC on 4 November and weakening into a remnant low-pressure area three hours later.

== Preparations and impact ==
=== Oman ===
By 30 October, well ahead of the storm, officials in Oman relayed the potential for flash flooding and high waves along the coast. The public was advised to stay away from low-lying areas, while fishermen were asked to avoid venturing into the sea, because of the potential for waves reaching 5 to 7 m (16 to 23 ft) in height. Officials closed all schools in Dhofar Governorate. The storm ultimately passed south of the country, sparing the feared impacts from the cyclone.

=== Somalia ===
Ahead of the storm, the threat of high seas spurred the United Nations High Commissioner for Refugees to dissuade Somali and Ethiopian refugees from crossing to Yemen. Large swells produced by Chapala caused extensive coastal damage in Somalia, damaging 280 boats. Eastern Puntland was hardest-hit, where the cyclone damaged 45 km (28 mi) of roads, and nine schools; about 2,000 students had to continue learning in tents. In the Bari region, Chapala wrecked 350 houses, leaving thousands of residents homeless. Also in the region, the storm killed 25,000 animals and downed 5,100 trees. Heavy rainfall from the storm spread to the northeastern tip of Somalia, and westward to the Berbera District in Somaliland. There, the storm killed 3,000 sheep and goats, as well as 200 camels; this severely affected the local nomadic population who rely on the livestock for their livelihood. Continuous rainfall forced families to leave their homes in low-lying areas for higher grounds.

After the storm, the government of Somaliland distributed rice, sugar, and plastic sheets. After Chapala and the subsequent Cyclone Megh, the local Red Cross chapter distributed blankets, sleeping mats, and mattresses to the affected families. The CARE relief agency provided US$300,000 toward relief goods and the restoration of safe water.

=== Yemen ===
Chapala during its landfall over Yemen on 3 November

Cyclone Chapala was slated to be the strongest tropical cyclone ever to affect Yemen, and this sparked fears of catastrophic flooding amid the ongoing civil war. The United Nations indicated that Yemen was in the midst of "one of the largest humanitarian crises in the world." Rainfall was forecast to total more than several years' worth of precipitation in some areas, bringing fears of "massive debris flows and flash flooding." Some weather models showed peak accumulations of 400 mm (16 in) or more. Fears of damage and loss of life were compounded by the power vacuum in areas controlled by al-Qaeda, particularly the port city of Mukalla where approximately 300,000 people lived.

The internationally recognized government, which controls most of southern Yemen, announced the suspension of schools in four governorates: Hadhramaut, Socotra, Al Mahrah and Shabwah. Yemen's meteorological agency told residents to stay at least 1 km (0.6 mi) inland. About 18,750 people left their homes ahead of the storm on the Yemen mainland. Most people sheltered in public buildings like schools or hospitals, or stayed with relatives. The World Health Organization distributed gasoline to ambulances and hospitals to ensure they would continue operating effectively. Al-Qaeda controlled Mukalla evacuated a coastal neighborhood.

==== Socotra ====
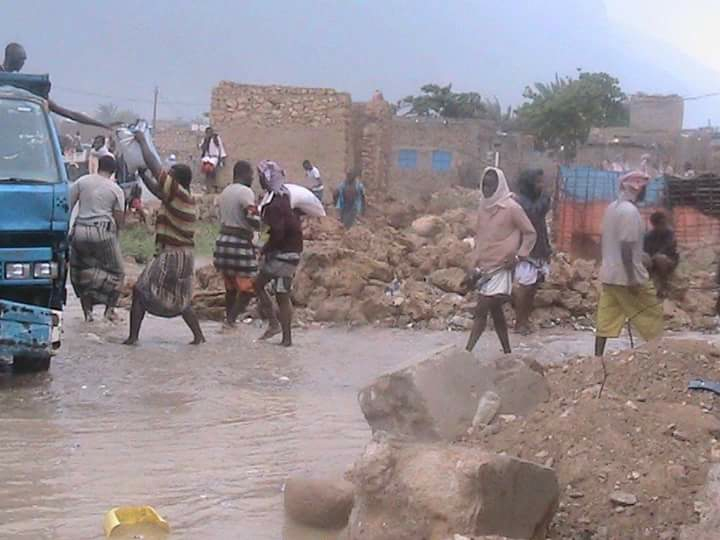
Flooding in Socotra on 1 November

In Socotra, over 1,000 families evacuated to schools set up as shelters. On 1 November, Chapala produced hurricane-force winds and heavy rainfall to the island. Residents described rainfall as the most severe in decades. Northeastern areas of the island were rendered inaccessible due to flooding, forcing residents to ride out the storm on their roofs. Chapala damaged Socotra's main port, and also caused an island-wide power outage. The cyclone destroyed 237 homes on the island and damaged 497 others, forcing about 18,000 people to leave their homes. Chapala caused at least 200 injuries. Despite initial reports of three deaths on the island, there were no confirmed fatalities on Socotra, according to the United Nations Office for the Coordination of Humanitarian Affairs (OCHA).

==== Mainland ====
High winds, strong waves, and heavy rainfall affected the southern Yemen coast. The weather station at Riyan Airport reported sustained winds of 117 km/h (73 mph), with gusts to 143 km/h (89 mph), before it stopped recording; the continued increase in winds supported that Chapala made landfall in Yemen as the equivalent of a hurricane. Some parts of the region received 610 mm (24 in) of rainfall, 700% of the yearly average, in just 48 hours. As the area usually receives less than 50 mm (2 in) of rainfall per year, the ground was unable to absorb much of the water. The resulting runoff triggered flash floods, collected along wadis, or typically dry river beds, and inundated coastal areas several kilometres inland.

Across Yemen's mainland, Chapala destroyed 214 homes and damaged another 600. The storm caused eight deaths – five by drowning and three inside collapsed homes. One of the deaths occurred as far west as Aden, where a fisherman drowned amid rough seas. Officials attributed the low death toll to the widespread evacuations ahead of the storm. About 65 people were injured, including 25 in Mukalla. Aon Benfield estimated nationwide damage in the hundreds of millions (USD).

Flooding from Chapala damaged crops, killed livestock, and wrecked boats. There, the storm damaged seven health facilities, including two in the nation's fifth-largest city, Mukalla. The storm severed phone lines, disrupted water access after damaging pipes, and damaged 90 houses. Residents in Mukalla took shelter in schools as the storm destroyed the waterfront. The city's main hospital was closed because of flooding, but reopened two days later. About 35 km (22 mi) of primary and secondary roads in and around Mukalla, including the coastal road from Aden to the city, were clogged with mud due to the floods and landslides. About 80% of the village of Jilah was flooded, damaging 250 houses.

== Aftermath ==
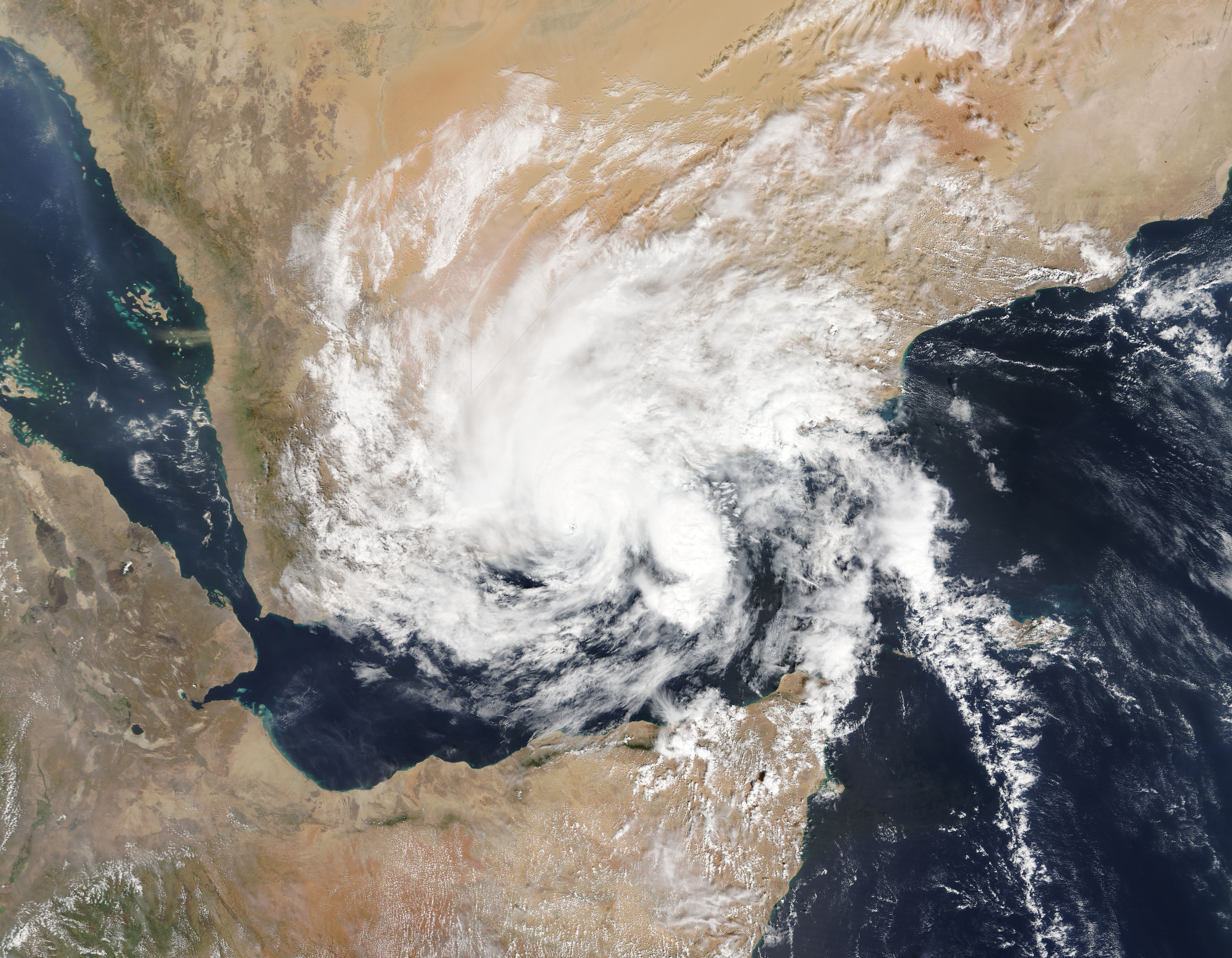
Satellite image of Chapala after its landfall over Yemen

The Yemeni Government declared a state of emergency for Socotra shortly after the storm's passage on 1 November. The local Red Crescent gave cooked meals and tarps to the island's residents. Several Persian Gulf countries sent 43 planes with supplies to the island by 19 November. Neighboring Oman sent 14 cargo planes' worth of food totaling 270 tons, as well as blankets and tents. The United Arab Emirates also sent a ship and a plane carrying 500 tons of food, 10 tons of blankets and tents, and 1,200 barrels of diesel fuel. The International Organization for Migration provided 2,000 shelter kits as well as a medical team to Socotra. Due to damage to the island's main port, residents built a makeshift pathway to help the distribution of aid.

In the days after the storm, airstrikes and attacks continued elsewhere in the country. One week after Chapala, Cyclone Megh followed a similar path. Together, the passages of Chapala and Megh near Socotra and mainland Yemen killed 26 people and displaced 47,000 people. Relief distribution was disrupted due to the poor communications in the region, worsened by the ongoing civil war, with the hardest hit areas under al-Qaeda control; aid trucks had to pass security clearances, resulting in delays. Workers began restoring communications and clearing roads in the days after the storm. By 19 November, most of the displaced residents had returned home, although some remained in shelters due to housing damage. Southern portions of Yemen saw food and fuel shortages following the two storms. Mukalla experienced an outbreak of dengue fever by January 2016 due to the floods, affecting 1,040 people; earlier efforts to kill disease carrying mosquitoes were ineffective due to residual floods and unsanitary conditions. Seven people died due to the outbreak. Flooding from Chapala led to a locust outbreak in March 2016, which spread across Yemen and reached as far as Pakistan.

Agencies under the United Nations and non-government organizations provided assistance to the storm victims, although aid agencies were cautious in helping a city under control of Al Qaeda. The Red Crescent Society of the United Arab Emirates, in conjunction with the Khalifa Foundation and the King Salman Humanitarian Aid and Relief Centre, provided aid to the hardest hit areas of mainland Yemen via an airbridge, as well as over land. United Nations agencies sent 29 trucks carrying 296 tons of non-food items, and the World Health Organization sent a ship from Djibouti with 18 tons of medical supplies. To prevent the spread of disease, officials distributed mosquito nets and began mass-immunizing children under five years old beginning in early November. A national effort to vaccinate against polio was disrupted in six governorates by the cyclone, but was completed by December. Médecins Sans Frontières established a medical clinic in Mukalla while also setting up a water tank. To help with food shortages, the World Food Programme had provided High Energy Biscuits by 30 November to 24,900 people, using pre-stocked supplies. The International Organization for Migration provided 41,000 litres (11,000 US gal) of water per day in Shabwah and Abyan governorates, and also helped clean sewage and storm debris. Agencies also delivered hygiene kits and food to the hardest hit areas. The United Nations High Commissioner for Refugees provided emergency beds, cooking utensils, and other supplies to about 1,600 families.

== See also ==
- Tropical cyclones in 2015
- Other tropical cyclones in:

- Horn of Africa
- Arabian Peninsula

- 2008 Yemen cyclone – a weak tropical cyclone that produced deadly flooding in Yemen
