= Victor Port =

Coordinates: 20°58′19″N 71°33′32″E

Victor Port is located near village Victor village in Rajula Taluka of Amreli district in Gujarat, India.

Victor Port is situated approximately 4.5 km south of Victor village on NH-8E near Pipavav port on Western side of Gulf of Khambhat.

Currently, Gujarat Maritime Board (GMB) has allocated the existing port facility of Victor Port to Om Sai Navigations Private Limited (OSNPL) in the Maritime India Summit 2016 for making Victor Port operational and development of multipurpose cargo terminals there.
