= Cyclone Tauktae =

North Indian Ocean cyclone in 2021

Extremely Severe Cyclonic Storm Tauktae
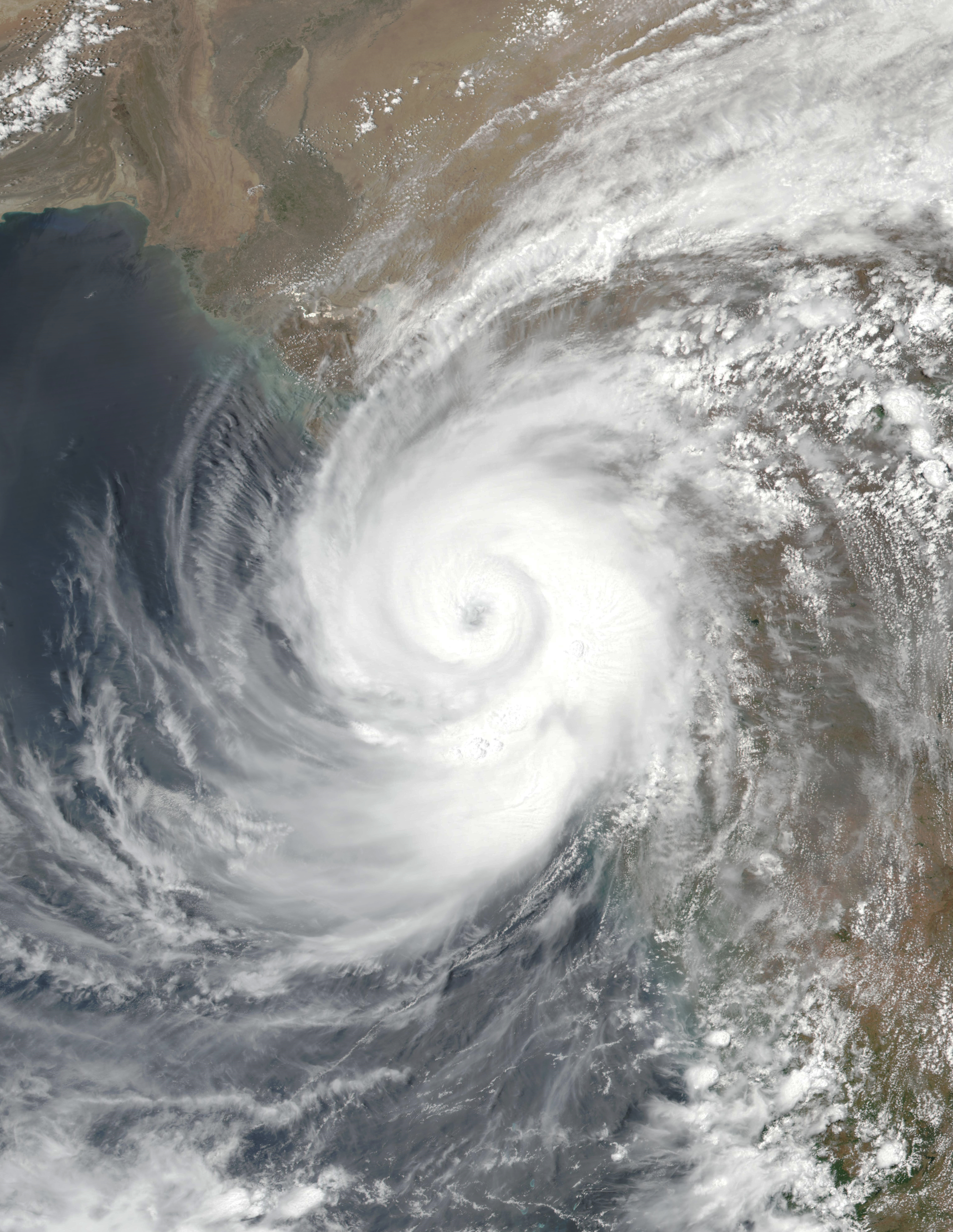
- Cyclone Tauktae near peak intensity approaching Gujarat in India on 17 May

Meteorological history
- Formed: 14 May 2021
- Dissipated: 19 May 2021

Extremely severe cyclonic storm
- 3-minute sustained (IMD)
- Highest winds: 185 km/h (115 mph)
- Lowest pressure: 950 hPa (mbar); 28.05 inHg

Category 4-equivalent tropical cyclone
- 1-minute sustained (SSHWS)
- Highest winds: 220 km/h (140 mph)
- Lowest pressure: 931 hPa (mbar); 27.49 inHg

Overall effects
- Fatalities: 174 total
- Missing: 81
- Damage: $2.25 billion (2021 USD)
- Areas affected: Dadra and Nagar Haveli and Daman and Diu; Goa; Gujarat; Karnataka; Kerala; Lakshadweep; Maharashtra; Delhi; Rajasthan; Haryana; Maldives; Pakistan (mainly Sindh); Sri Lanka
- Part of the 2021 North Indian Ocean cyclone season

Extremely Severe Cyclonic Storm Tauktae (Note: The name Tauktae (Burmese: တောက်တဲ့, [taʊʔ.tɛ̰]) was contributed by Myanmar and means "gecko" in Burmese) was a powerful, deadly and damaging tropical cyclone in the Arabian Sea that became the strongest tropical cyclone to make landfall in the Indian state of Gujarat since the 1998 Gujarat cyclone. One of the strongest tropical cyclones to ever affect the west coast of India, Tauktae was the strongest storm of 2021 North Indian Ocean cyclone season. The second depression, first cyclonic storm, first severe cyclonic storm, first very severe cyclonic storm, and first extremely severe cyclonic storm of the 2021 North Indian Ocean cyclone season, Tauktae originated from an area of low pressure in the Arabian Sea, which was first monitored by the India Meteorological Department on 13 May. The low drifted eastward and organized into a deep depression by 14 May. The storm soon took a northward turn, continuing to gradually intensify because of warm waters near the coast, and the system strengthened into a cyclonic storm and was named Tauktae later that same day. Tauktae continued intensifying into 15 May, reaching severe cyclonic storm status later that day. Tauktae began to parallel the coast of the Indian states of Kerala, Karnataka, Goa and Maharashtra, before rapidly intensifying into a very severe cyclonic storm, early on 16 May. Early on 17 May, Tauktae intensified into an extremely severe cyclonic storm, reaching its peak intensity soon afterward. Later that same day, Tauktae underwent an eyewall replacement cycle and weakened, before restrengthening as it neared the coast of Gujarat, making landfall soon afterward.

After making landfall, Tauktae gradually weakened as it slowly turned northeastward, moving further inland. On 19 May, Tauktae weakened into a well-marked low-pressure area. Tauktae brought heavy rainfall and flash floods to areas along the coast of Kerala and on Lakshadweep. There were reports of heavy rain in the states of Goa, Karnataka and Maharashtra as well. Tauktae resulted in at least 169 deaths in India, and left another 81 people missing. There were also 5 deaths reported in Pakistan. The storm displaced over 200,000 people in Gujarat. The cyclone also caused widespread infrastructure and agricultural damage to the western coast of India. Upwards of 40 fishermen were lost at sea when their boats were caught in the cyclone. Mumbai also experienced the impact of the storm, with airports being closed for safety reasons.

The city experienced their highest ever recorded wind gust at 114 km/h (71 mph). Power outages and other electrical problems also prevailed in the impacted regions. The cyclone made landfall in Gujarat the same day as India recorded its, at the time, highest single-day COVID-19 death toll, with 4,329 deaths reported. The cyclone also caused a large amount of maritime incidents as it moved along the coast of western India. Hundreds were missing from various barges; however, most of them have been rescued. Other larger ships also experienced problems, such as structure or power losses. At least 174 people have been killed by the storm, with over 80 still missing. Losses from Tauktae were calculated at ₹165 billion or US$2.25 billion.

== Meteorological history ==
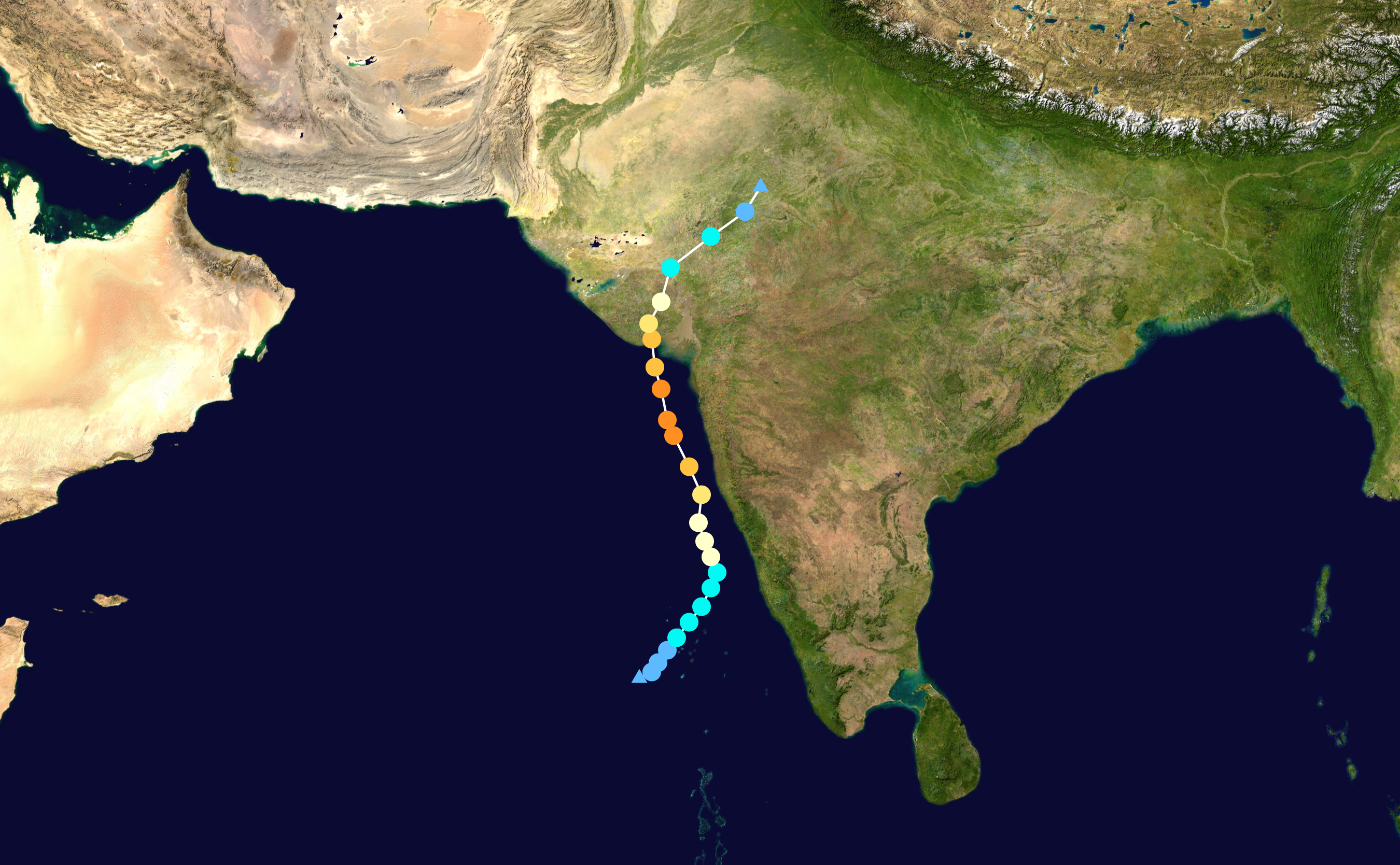
Map plotting the storm's track and intensity, according to the Saffir–Simpson scale Map key Saffir–Simpson scale Tropical depression (≤38 mph, ≤62 km/h) Tropical storm (39–73 mph, 63–118 km/h) Category 1 (74–95 mph, 119–153 km/h) Category 2 (96–110 mph, 154–177 km/h) Category 3 (111–129 mph, 178–208 km/h) Category 4 (130–156 mph, 209–251 km/h) Category 5 (≥157 mph, ≥252 km/h) Unknown Storm type Tropical cyclone Subtropical cyclone Extratropical cyclone, remnant low, tropical disturbance, or monsoon depression

11 On May, the Joint Typhoon Warning Center (JTWC) began monitoring a large area of low pressure in the equatorial Arabian Sea for potential tropical cyclone development. As the system slowly moved eastwards, it gradually organized amid favorable conditions, including sea surface temperatures of up to 30 °C (86 degrees Fahrenheit) and low wind shear. The JTWC issued a Tropical Cyclone Formation Alert on this system on 13 May. A few hours later, the JTWC designated it as Tropical Cyclone 01A. The system gradually intensified, as the previously disorganized broad area of convection began to wrap around the low-level circulation center. It further strengthened to become a deep depression at 12:00 UTC the next day. Around this time, the system turned northeastwards and began to move towards India. Due to the very large area of convection over the cyclone, it dumped heavy rainfall over the southern portions of the country. Six hours after the upgrade, the system became even more organized and intensified into a cyclonic storm, receiving the name Tauktae by the IMD. Tauktae later intensified into a Severe Cyclonic Storm at 15:00 UTC on 15 May as a robust central dense overcast developed. Just three hours later, the JTWC upgraded Tauktae to a Category 1 tropical cyclone on the Saffir–Simpson scale (SSHWS), while a ragged eye appeared on infrared satellite imagery as the storm started a period of rapid intensification.

Early the next day, the cyclone turned northward, paralleling the west coast of India. Amid the favorable conditions stated earlier, the storm rapidly intensified, and at 06:00 UTC that day, the JTWC upgraded the system to a Category 2 tropical cyclone. By 09:00 UTC, the cyclone had developed a well-defined, but ragged eye, according to INSAT imagery, and the JTWC upgraded Tauktae to a Category 3-equivalent tropical cyclone, as rapid intensification continued. Despite this period of strengthening, the eye of the storm degraded for a while, according to INSAT imagery. Later, the storm continued intensifying, and at 03:00 UTC on 17 May Tauktae reached its peak intensity as an extremely severe cyclonic storm, with maximum 3-minute sustained winds of 185 km/h (115 mph), maximum 1-minute sustained winds of 220 km/h (135 mph), and a minimum central pressure of 950 millibars (28 inHg), making the storm the equivalent of a Category 4 tropical cyclone on the Saffir–Simpson scale. Soon afterward, Tauktae initiated an eyewall replacement cycle, which started to weaken the storm.

As the storm neared the coast of Gujarat, Tauktae completed its eyewall replacement cycle and began to reorganize, as a new eye became visible on satellite imagery, and the cloud top temperatures dropped in the central dense overcast (CDO) region. At 8:30 p.m. local time (IST), the cyclone made landfall near Una in Gujarat. Soon afterward, the JTWC issued their final warning on the system. In the advisory, the agency estimated Tauktae's 1-minute sustained winds at landfall to be 125 mph (205 kilometres per hour), making Tauktae the equivalent of a high-end Category 3 tropical cyclone, making it the strongest storm to make landfall in Gujarat since reliable records began, surpassing the record set by 1998 Gujarat cyclone. Afterward, due to land interaction, the storm began to weaken slowly; the Brown ocean effect from the Gulf of Kutch and Gulf of Khambhat caused the storm to weaken at a slower pace than usual. By 11:30 a.m. local time (IST), the storm had weakened below severe cyclonic storm intensity, before weakening below cyclonic storm intensity twelve hours later, after traversing the rugged terrain of the Aravalli Range, bringing heavy rainfall and wind gusts to the region of North India. At 14:00 UTC on 19 May, Tauktae weakened into a well-marked low-pressure area over Rajasthan and adjoining Madhya Pradesh, and the IMD issued their final bulletin on the storm.

== Preparations ==
=== India ===
==== Pre-landfall ====
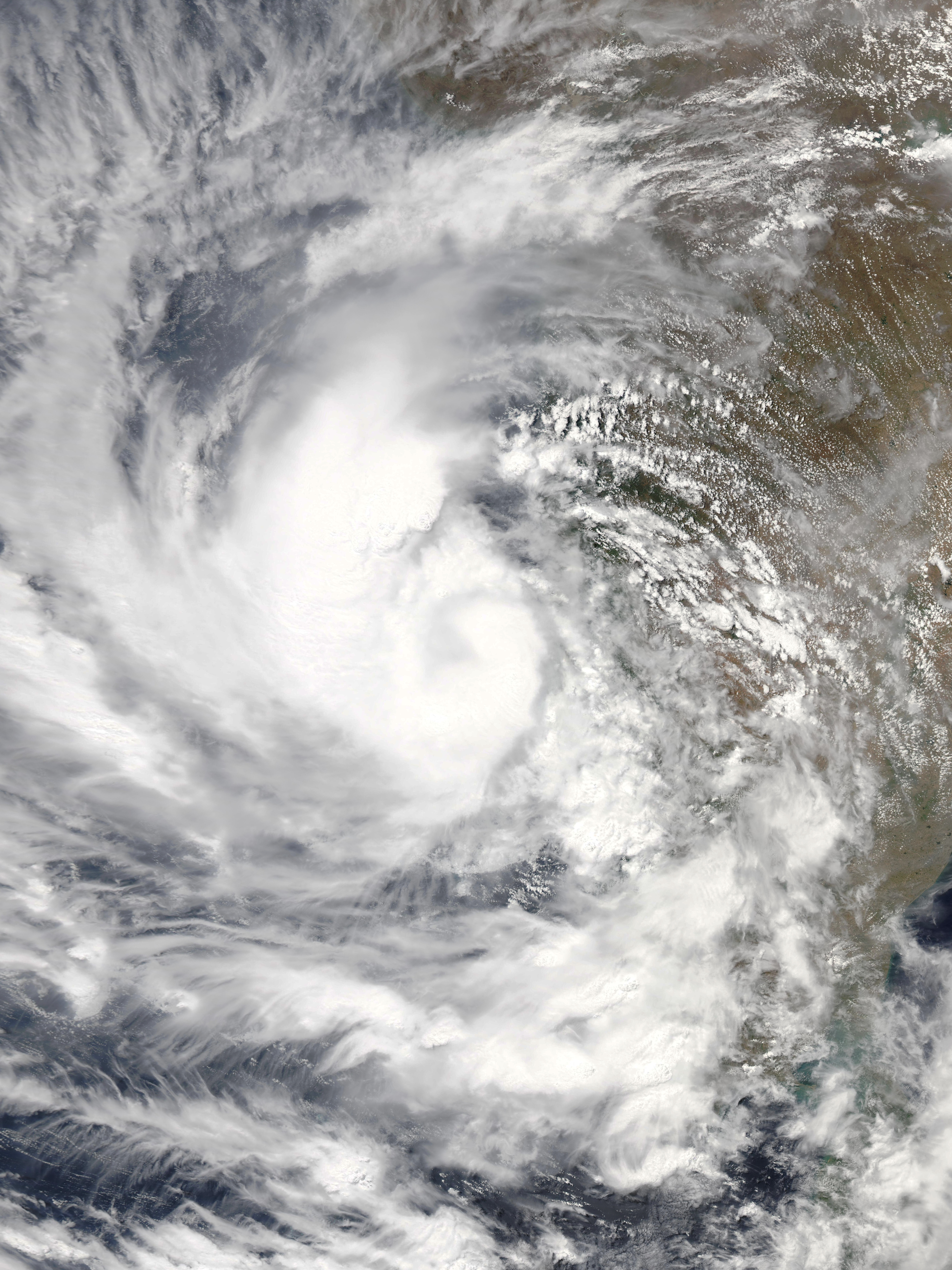
Cyclonic Storm Tauktae seen off the west coast of India on 15 May

On 16 May 2021, Indian Prime Minister Narendra Modi held a high review meeting to review preparedness on the cyclone through video conferencing with various senior officials in New Delhi. All coastal fishing in Kerala was banned by the state's disaster management authority between 13 and 17 May in anticipation of rough seas caused by Tauktae's formation and traversal of the offshore waters. The IMD issued a red alert for nine districts in Kerala for torrential rainfall on 15 May, including Lakshadweep. All flights at Agatti Airport in Lakshadweep were suspended while the cyclone passed over the archipelago. The National Disaster Response Force (NDRF) dispatched nine teams to Kerala while detachments of the Indian military were placed on standby. Supplemental oxygen and other medical supplies were also brought within the risk areas from both domestic and foreign sources. Three fishermen on an inoperable vessel were rescued by the Indian Coast Guard 19 km (12 mi) off Kannur on 14 May. More than 2,000 people were evacuated to 71 centres were established for populations vulnerable to coastal erosion while COVID-19 patients among the evacuees were brought to specialised treatment centres. A curfew initially imposed to curtail the spread of COVID-19 in Dakshina Kannada, Karnataka. In total, the NDRF mobilised 4,700 personnel in 100 teams across six states. In Gujarat, 200,000 people were evacuated from low-lying areas all while 54 teams of the National Disaster Response Force and State Disaster Response Force (SDRF) were deployed. In Maharashtra, Chief Minister Uddhav Thackeray said alerts had been raised for coastal districts and that the state administration had been preparing to ensure that electricity and oxygen supply would remain in COVID-19 hospitals. Operations at Mumbai International Airport were suspended on 17 May between 11:00 and 14:00 IST. Bandra Worli Sea Link was also closed for normal traffic and the COVID-19 vaccination drive in Mumbai was also suspended for the day.

On 16 May, the number of people evacuated quickly grew to tens of thousands of people as Tauktae neared the Gujarati coast. The IMD said tidal waves of up to nine feet were expected in the area. Government officials of the Indian state said that over 150,000 people were to be evacuated from vulnerable areas on Sunday evening. All fishing was suspended until Monday near the Gujarat coast. More than 170 mobile intensive care unit vans were deployed to help prevent the possibility of the current surge in COVID-19 cases being worsened. Hospitals windproofed their buildings to prevent damage. The Navy was placed on standby in Gujarat. The army was also reported to be continuously watching Tauktae. At this time, 180 relief and rescue teams and 9 ETFs were also on standby. The IMD warned of coastal flooding caused by storm surge of up to 13 feet. Ahmedabad, Gujarat's most populous city, was predicted to receive up to 4 inches of rainfall during the next 1–2 days, more than the average amount that the city receives in the first half of the year. Hundreds of COVID-19 patients were shifted from coastal wards in Mumbai to safer ground. Crews, dressed in hazmat suits, patrolled coastal areas and warned locals to get to higher ground.

==== Post-landfall ====
As the storm moved through Gujarat and weakened much more slowly than previously expected, rainfall predictions were made by the IMD for various areas of the state. On 19 May, an orange alert was issued for Delhi and adjoining parts of Haryana and West Uttar Pradesh. Localized flooding, waterlogging of low-lying areas and closures of underpasses in hilly areas was warned. Reduction in visibility, disruption of traffic, road and structure damage, and agricultural impacts were also of concern. Isolated areas were expected to receive "very heavy" rainfall, over a "fairly widespread" to "widespread" region. The IMD advised those at risk to check for traffic congestion on their planned routes, follow traffic warnings, and to avoid going to places at risk of water damage and waterlogging. National capital New Delhi witnessed heavy downpours on 19 May, totaling 119.3 mm in 24 hours, the highest single-day rainfall in history in May, with waterlogging reported in many areas. Similar intensity rainfall was witnessed over Rewari in Haryana and Bareilly in Uttar Pradesh.

=== Pakistan ===
Chief Minister of Sindh Syed Murad Ali Shah held a cyclone emergency meeting, where he declared an emergency in every district located along the coastal belt of the province.

== Impact ==
=== India ===
In total, 169 people had died in India as a result of Cyclone Tauktae, with at least 80 others injured and about 81 missing. 10 died in Kerala, 8 in Karnataka, 3 in Goa, 18 in Maharashtra, 64 in Gujarat, while 66 died from the sinking of Barge P305. 11,774,038 people have been affected, 257,135 evacuated, and over 56,846 houses have been damaged. 69,429 electric poles and 196 roads have been damaged, as well as more than 40,000 trees. Water supply system in 5,951 villages were damaged too.

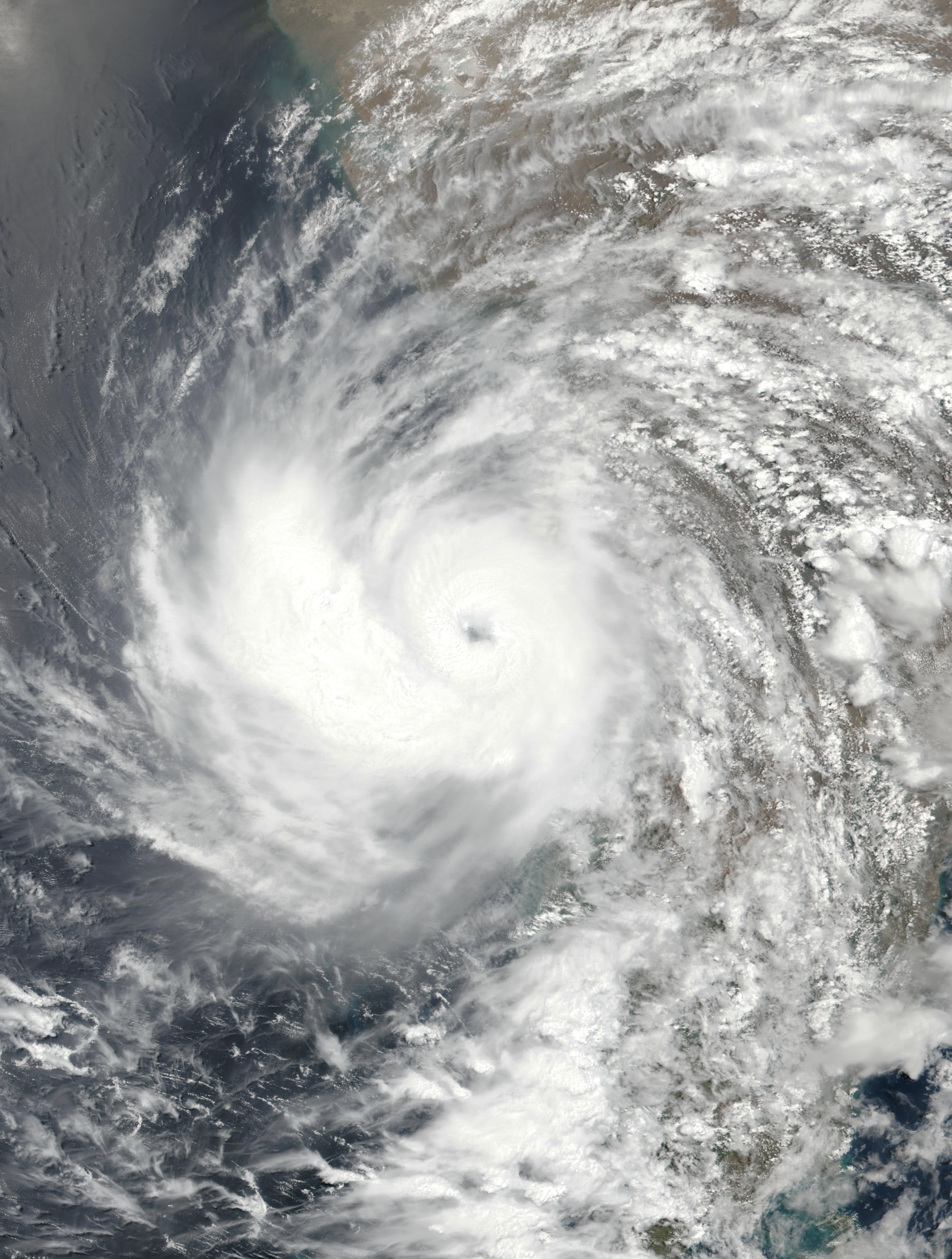
Very Severe Cyclonic Storm Tauktae on 16 May paralleling the west coast of India

==== South India ====
Although it remained offshore, Tauktae brought heavy rainfall to Kerala. An average of 145.5 mm (5.73 in) of rain fell across the state on 15 May, damaging its agriculture and power infrastructure. Flash floods occurred and soil was waterlogged in Kerala. Over a hundred homes sustained damage throughout the state. Two people were killed in Ernakulam and Kozhikode districts of Kerala, with a state total of 10. Severe coastal erosion occurred in Ambalappuzha, Cherthala, and Karthikappally. Homes were damaged or destroyed in Alappuzha and Kadakkarappally by Tauktae's strong winds. Numerous trees were uprooted and power supplies were disrupted in Alappuzha. Several districts and municipalities reported considerable impacts from heavy rain. Floodwaters in Kerala's Central Division washed out at least 248 ha (610 acres) of crops worth ₹52 million (US$710 thousand). Agricultural losses statewide reached ₹8.28 billion (US$113 million) The coast of Karnataka was buffeted by high winds and heavy rain, while waves with heights as high as 4.2 m (14 ft) tall drifted through the Arabian Sea. Over 70 villages in seven districts of Karnataka were affected by the cyclone, according to the Karnataka State Disaster Management Authority. 385 mm (15.2 in) of rain fell at Nada Station in Kundapur Taluk, Karnataka, while several other stations recorded at least 200 mm (7.9 in) of rainfall. Sustained winds of 90 km/h (56 mph) battered the state coastline for hours, damaging at least 112 homes, with at least 139 electricity poles being blown over.

As Tauktae continued to lash the coast with heavy rain, rainfall warnings were imposed in parts of Lakshadweep, Kerala, western Tamil Nadu, coastal districts of Karnataka, Goa, Gujarat and southwestern Rajasthan. In Chellanam, a coastal village in Ernakulam district, homes were submerged due to unexpected rain and sea erosion. The administration opened up a relief camp at the local St. Mary's School for the inhabitants of low-lying areas. Due to the ongoing, deadly second wave of the COVID-19 pandemic in India, isolated testing facilities were arranged. 23 fishermen from Kerala were missing after two boats, Ajmir Shah and Andavar Thunai, with 15 and 8 fishermen aboard respectively, were likely caught in the cyclone after leaving in early May. Nine fishermen from Tamil Nadu were also left missing after their boat capsized in the Arabian Sea, and the Maritime Rescue Coordination Centre Mumbai was notified of the incident. Several areas in Goa were left without power as a result of damage caused to the power supply. 200 homes were reportedly damaged in Goa, while many roads were blocked by fallen trees. A woman died in Goa after a coconut tree fell on her head, due to the high winds, and one child died from a falling electric pole. Two people died in Karnataka after a tugboat capsized in the Dakshina Kannada district. The state total is 8. Over 120 houses were damaged in the Dakshina Kannada district due to heavy rains. 98 villages were said to be badly damaged in the state of Karnataka. Over 1,000 trees were uprooted in Goa. 43 wall collapse incidents were recorded in Mumbai. Total damages in Goa were estimated at ₹1.46 billion (US$20 million) by the Government of Goa. It also reported the deaths of two people in cyclone related incidents.

==== Maharashtra ====
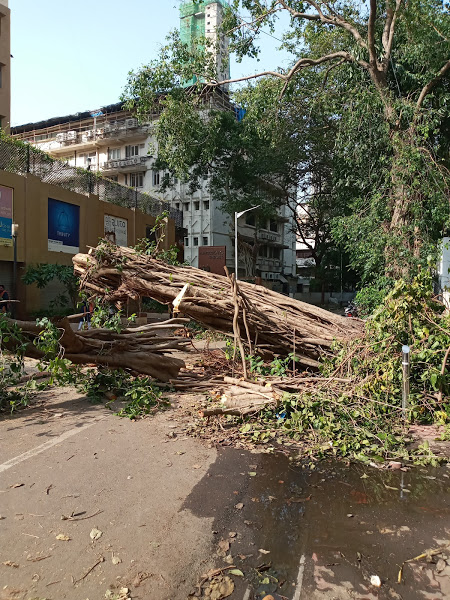
A downed banyan tree in the Prabhadevi district of Mumbai.

21 people were killed and nine were injured in the state of Maharashtra, and over 2,542 buildings were damaged. The Indian Express reported that train services were suspended due to flooding and fallen trees on tracks, which were blocking routes. Two barges were adrift off the coast of Mumbai due to the cyclone, containing about 400 people. Mumbai recorded more than 300 mm (12 in) of rain, becoming the highest amount of rainfall recorded in May since records began in the 19th century. The previous record was set on May 20, 2000, which was 191 mm (7.5 in). Along with torrential downpour, squally winds reaching more than 100 km/h (62 mph) was recorded. The maximum wind speed recorded was 108 km/h (67 mph), the highest recorded wind gust in last 70 years. It uprooted more than 600 trees across the city, destroyed thousands of homes, waterlogged most of the city roads and disrupted electricity supply and traffic. The Chhatrapati Shivaji Maharaj International Airport was shut for over 11 hours with 55 flights cancelled and several flights routed to other cities. The Wankhede Stadium also experienced major damage due to a 16 ft (4.9 m) sightscreen of the North Side being damaged by powerful winds, similar to an incident in 2011. A total of three people died and ten people were injured in Mumbai. Two children lost their lives after an uprooted tree fell on their hut in Maharashtra's Jalgaon district. On 16 May, at least four people were killed and seven people were hurt when the slab of a residential building crashed in the Ulhasnagar town of the district. In Raigad district alone around 800 homes were damaged. In Konkan region, Maharashtra's coastal area, around ₹5 billion (US$68.3 million) of worth Alphonso mango crops were damaged. The Bandra–Worli Sea Link was closed because of strong winds. Many structures were damaged by winds and 4.6 million consumers suffered power cuts in Maharashtra. Between 3,500 and 5,000 hectares of standing horticulture have been damaged. It was the most powerful storm to affect Mumbai since Cyclone Nisarga in 2020. The Government of Maharashtra approved compensation of ₹2.52 billion (US$34.4 million).

==== Gujarat ====
Cyclone Tauktae making landfall in Saurashtra

The cyclone made landfall in the region of Saurashtra between Diu and Rajula at around 21:00 IST, and weakened to a Very Severe Cyclonic Storm. Wind speeds of approximately 150 to 175 kilometres per hour (93 to 109 mph) were recorded at the district of Diu in the union territory of Dadra and Nagar Haveli and Daman and Diu. A total of 67 people were killed in Gujarat, while 55,384 homes were damaged. Over 1,000 poles were uprooted while and over 2,400 villages witnessed power supply failures. Only 100 COVID-19 hospitals out of the 400 in the state had power. All hospitals had generators, however, four of them failed. Authorities were sent to repair them. The situation the cyclone brought was labeled as a "double blow" by Udaya Regmi, the South Asian head of the International Federation of Red Cross and Red Crescent Societies (IFRCRCS). A COVID-induced curfew that was issued across 36 cities was extended three days due to the cyclone. Originally, it was expected to be cancelled on Tuesday. Several food and water sources that are needed for farmers were interrupted.

In the village of Vijapadi, located in Amreli district near the landfall site, most of the houses were damaged by the cyclone due to their weak structures. Many residents were moved to a high school and a madrasa to protect themselves from the storm. The previous afternoon, their power supply had been damaged. Over 30 bullocks, worth ₹18,000 each, were killed in the area. In neighbouring Hadidad, homes were damaged, along with banana plantations being flattened, with little being left. Houses were said to be totally damaged, being reduced to less than huts. Other livestock, such as goats, were killed in the village.

In Saurashtra, storm surge estimated up to 3 m (9.8 ft) was recorded in the coastal districts. Electricity supply was disrupted due to high winds in parts of Amreli, Gir-Somnath, and Diu. Over 100 anchored ships were sent back to the higher grounds due to fears of storm surge. The districts of Junagadh, Gir-Somnath, Bhavnagar, and Amreli were battered by heavy rainfall and winds up to 100 km/h (62 mph) by noon of 17 May, also being accompanied with dust storms in other regions.

Lots of trees including mango farms are uprooted in Rajula . highest number of house damaged are reported in taluka of Rajula .coastal highway near Kodinar was blocked by uprooted coconut trees. A mobile tower and approximately 200 trees fell in Una. Many areas were affected by power outages.

Ahmedabad recorded 114 mm (4.5 in) of rainfall within 24 hours, nearly breaking a rainfall record of 138.3 mm (5.44 in) which was recorded on 9 May 1982. The cyclone caused downpours that began in the afternoon and ended at midnight without stopping. Gusty winds reaching up to 60 to 70 km/h (35 to 45 mph) were recorded in the city.

By 19 May, mobile phone networks were stilled down in several areas after the storm hit the state. Over 600 roads were blocked. A major mango growing belt was damaged.

According to initial estimates, the private ports in Gujarat suffered damages worth ₹7 billion (US$95.6 million) while Gujarat Maritime Board-owned ports suffered damages of ₹50 million (US$680 thousand). RSMI estimated the total damage statewide to be ₹150 billion (US$2.05 billion).

==== Maritime incidents ====
66 people died, at least 20 people are still missing after Barge P305 sank near Heera oil field, off the coast of Mumbai, although the Indian Navy said it had rescued 186 survivors of the 270 people aboard by 19 May. 37 bodies were recovered, while 40 passengers remain missing. INS Kochi entered Mumbai Harbour with the rescued people. Three other commercial barges carrying about 700 people are still stranded at sea, one off the coast of Gujarat and the other two near Mumbai. Barge Allianz Commander reported a damage at its cow catcher area and water started filling inside the barge with 300 people on board, the condition was very critical. Search and rescue operations were underway for one of the 270-passenger barges. The search was conducted in winds reaching 90 to 100 km/h (55 to 60 mph), with waves reaching as high as 9 to 10 m (30 to 35 ft). Meanwhile INS Kochi, the INS Kolkata, and the INS Talwar continued their search operations.

A freight ship, oil rig, and four vessels that serviced ONGC's off-shore operations were caught in the cyclone. ONGC held a crew of 261. The men who became stranded on their vessels were maintenance staff. 188 men were rescued from the ships, and 26 bodies were recovered while the search continued for the remaining 47 men. Several other barges were rescued: Gal Constructor with 137 people, Sagar Bhushan (the oil rig) with 101 people, SS03 with 202 men, and M.V. Daniel (the freight ship) with 202 people. Nine crewmembers were tugged ashore when the tug, Coromandal Supporter IX, went aground off of Karnataka. Two other boats lost power and were in need of a tow in rough conditions. The Maharashtra government later criticised the company for ignoring warnings of Cyclone Tauktae.

=== Other countries ===
In Pakistan, the outer wind field of the storm reached as far as lower Sindh province. At least five people, including two children, died in roof and wall collapse incidents; with twelve wounded in separate incidents. The dust storm also caused to uproot trees, signboard and electric poles. The Pakistan Meteorological Department (PMD) recorded 7 mm (0.28 in) of rain in the city. It cause a heatwave in the city with temperatures reaching as high as 43.5 °C (110.3 °F). In Maldives and Sri Lanka, over 730 families were affected by the cyclone.

== Aftermath ==
=== India ===
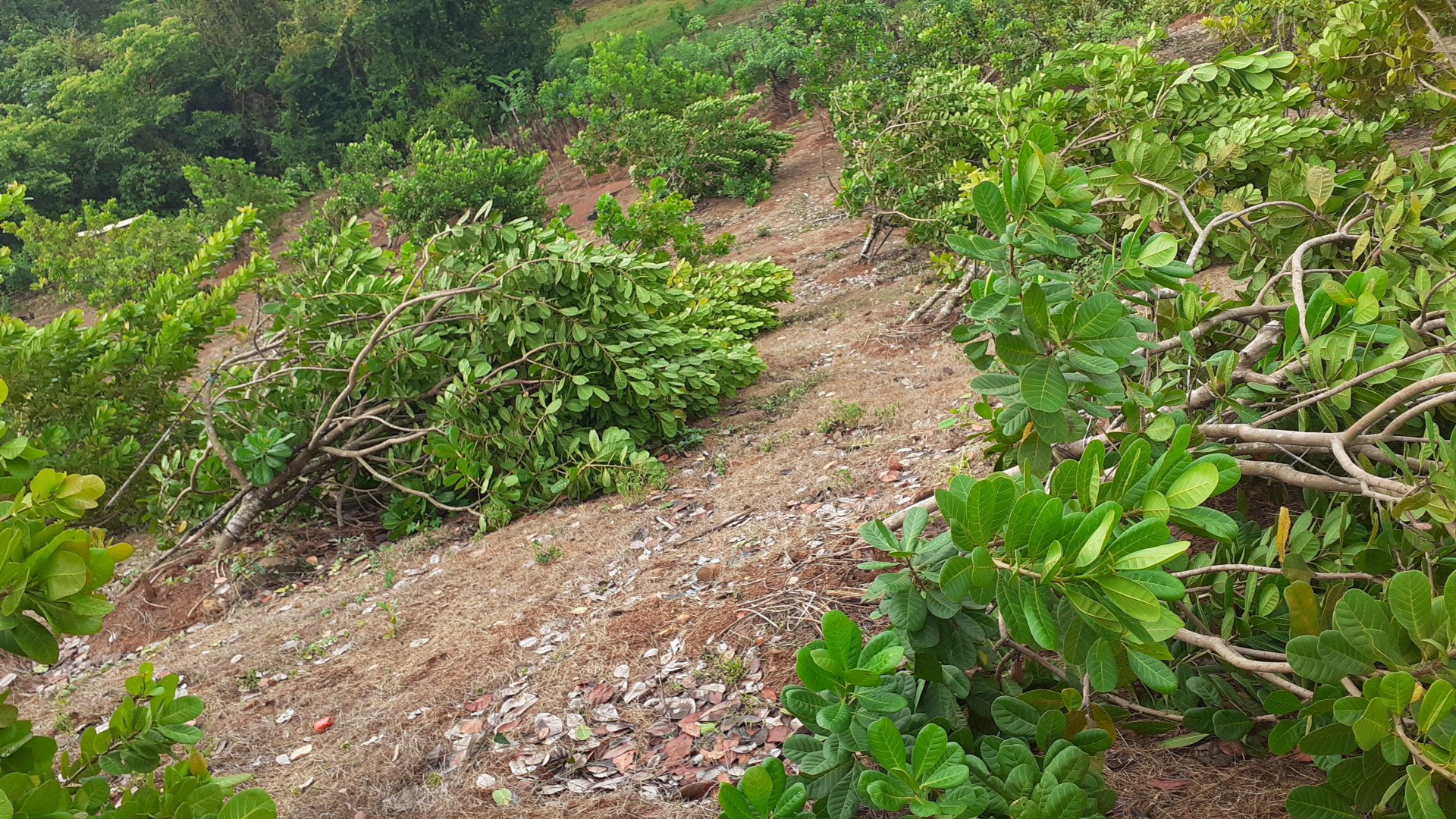
Damage to cashew plants in Dodamarg, Kokan.

The National Disaster Response Force (NDRF) chief, S.N. Pradhan, said that doctors and various medical staff were sent to the affected states, as well as 100 relief teams. However, only vaccinated personnel were sent. Special arrangements for hospitals, COVID-19 support, and other needs were made to ensure electricity would not be interrupted.

In Kerala and Karnataka, thousands sought refuge in relief camps due to their homes being damaged by Tauktae, according to the two states' chief ministers. Large amounts of concern lingered for hospitals' abilities to keep enough oxygen for COVID-19 patients, as well as plants generating enough of it. After taking an aerial trip of the areas hit by Tauktae, Prime Minister Narendra Modi announced that he would give ₹1,000 crore (US$100 million) for immediate relief in Gujarat. He also stated he would give ₹2 lakh (US$2,100) each to families who had their members die in the cyclone. A sum of ₹50,000 (US$520) would be paid to those injured. He assured that the central government was working closely with the affected states. An inter-ministerial team was also planned to be sent to Gujarat to assess the damage. After, aid would be extended. Due to the unexpected intensity of the cyclone, rescue operations were slower than previously thought. As of 19 May, the true number of missing people is still being determined. Despite the power interruptions, all COVID-19 hospitals remained at least somewhat functional.

Over 36,000 people were in mass shelters at one time. Evacuated people have been given necessary items in camps; however, they were feared to run out of food rations, hygiene items, and experience loss of lives. The cleaning and repair of huge amounts of houses was thought to be a main concern. Humanitarian assistance was desperately needed for six districts in Gujarat. 230 COVID-ICU patients in Mumbai were shifted from a jumbo COVID-19 center to other, more resilient centers. During a press briefing, the Chief Minister of Gujarat, Vijay Rupani stated that advance preparations and planning led to well-timed evacuations. He also extended the suspension of the COVID-19 vaccination drive by one day, and it was expected to resume on 20 May. UNICEF supported those affected by Tauktae and worked with the interagency group of Gujarat.

The Government of Gujarat asked for additional ₹9,836 crore (US$1.0 billion) from National Disaster Response Fund and ₹500 crore (US$52 million) from State Disaster Response Fund from the Government of India for relief works.

Cyclone Tauktae also caused increased chlorophyll concentration on the coasts of Maharashtra and Gujarat.

== See also ==
- Weather of 2021
- Tropical cyclones in 2021
- List of the most intense tropical cyclones
- List of Gujarat tropical cyclones
- 1998 Gujarat cyclone – Deadly tropical cyclone that killed at least 10,000 people in India.
- 2001 India cyclone – Third strongest tropical cyclone, in terms of barometric pressure, to form in the Arabian Sea on record.
- Cyclone Vayu – A strong Arabian Sea tropical cyclone that caused moderate damage in India during June 2019.
- Cyclone Amphan – The powerful cyclone to strike the Indian states of West Bengal and Odisha in 2020.
- Cyclone Nisarga – The strongest tropical cyclone to strike the Indian state of Maharashtra since 1891.
- Cyclone Biparjoy – a long-lived and strong tropical cyclone that also made landfall at Gujarat.
