= Rajula =

- Town
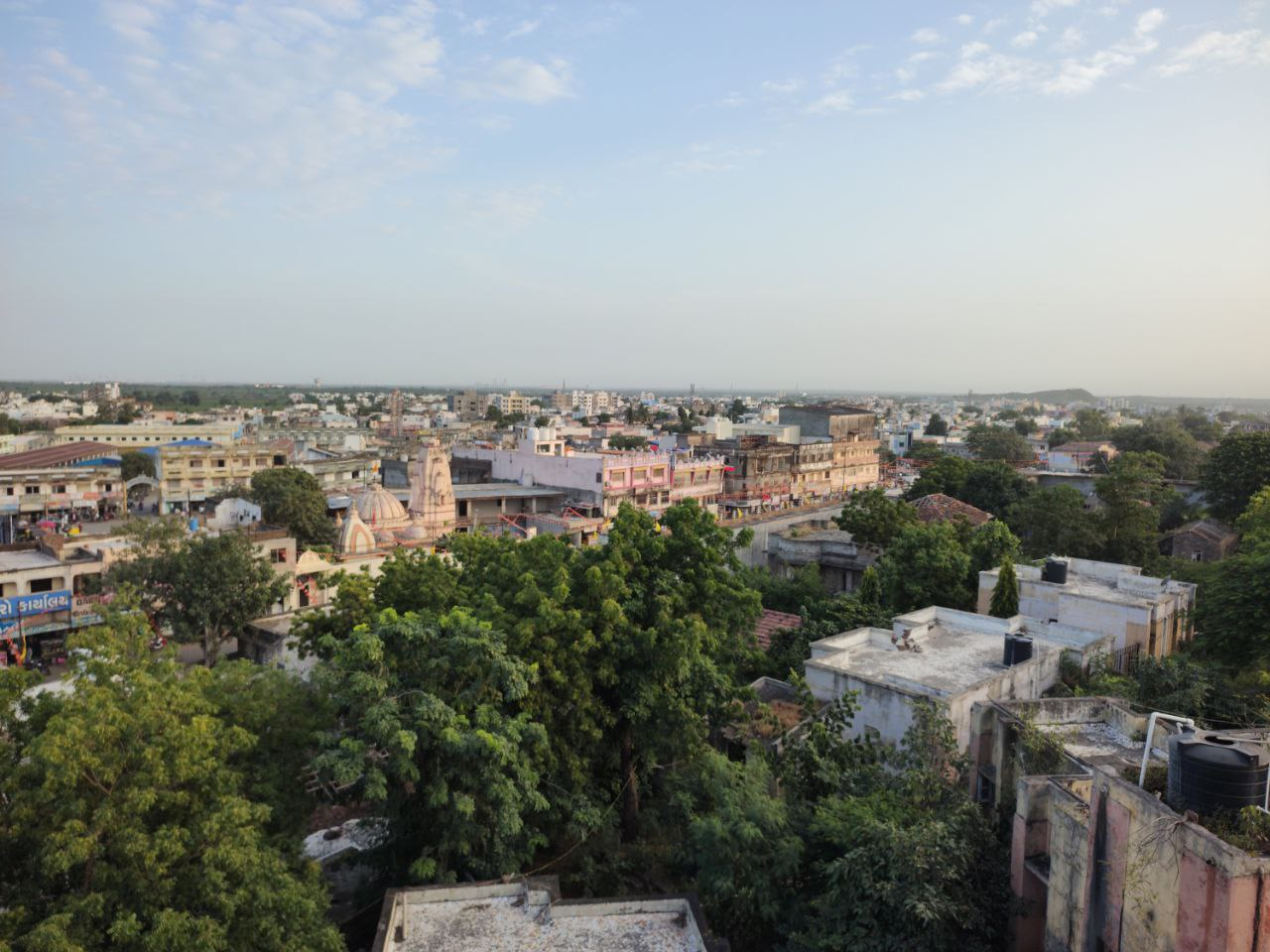
- Town view

- Location in Gujarat, India
- Coordinates: 21.05°N 71.43°E
- Country: India
- State: Gujarat
- District: Amreli

Area
  - Total: 2.32 km^{2} (0.90 sq mi)
- Elevation: 41 m (135 ft)

Population (2024)
  - Total: 80,393
  - Density: 34,700/km^{2} (89,700/sq mi)
- Time zone: UTC+5:30 (IST)
- Postal code: 365560

Rajula is a town and municipality in Amreli district in the Indian state of Gujarat.The city was founded by Daha Dhakhada nearly 1759, on the bank of river Dhatarvadi and among the hills called Piliyo and Rajuliyo; the Dhakhdas and other Babariya Kathis captured the surrounding region, which was known as Babariyawad.

== Etymology ==
Sources claims that Rajula name derives from Princess Rajulakumari, also known as Rajamati, wife of lord Neminath famous tirthkara in Jainism.

== Demographics ==
As of the 2001 Indian census, Rajula had a population of approximately 80,393. Females constituted 49% of the population. Rajula has an average literacy rate of 64%, higher than the national average of 59.5%, with male literacy at 72% and female, 55%. In Rajula, 15% of the population is under 6 years of age.

== Temples and tourist attractions ==
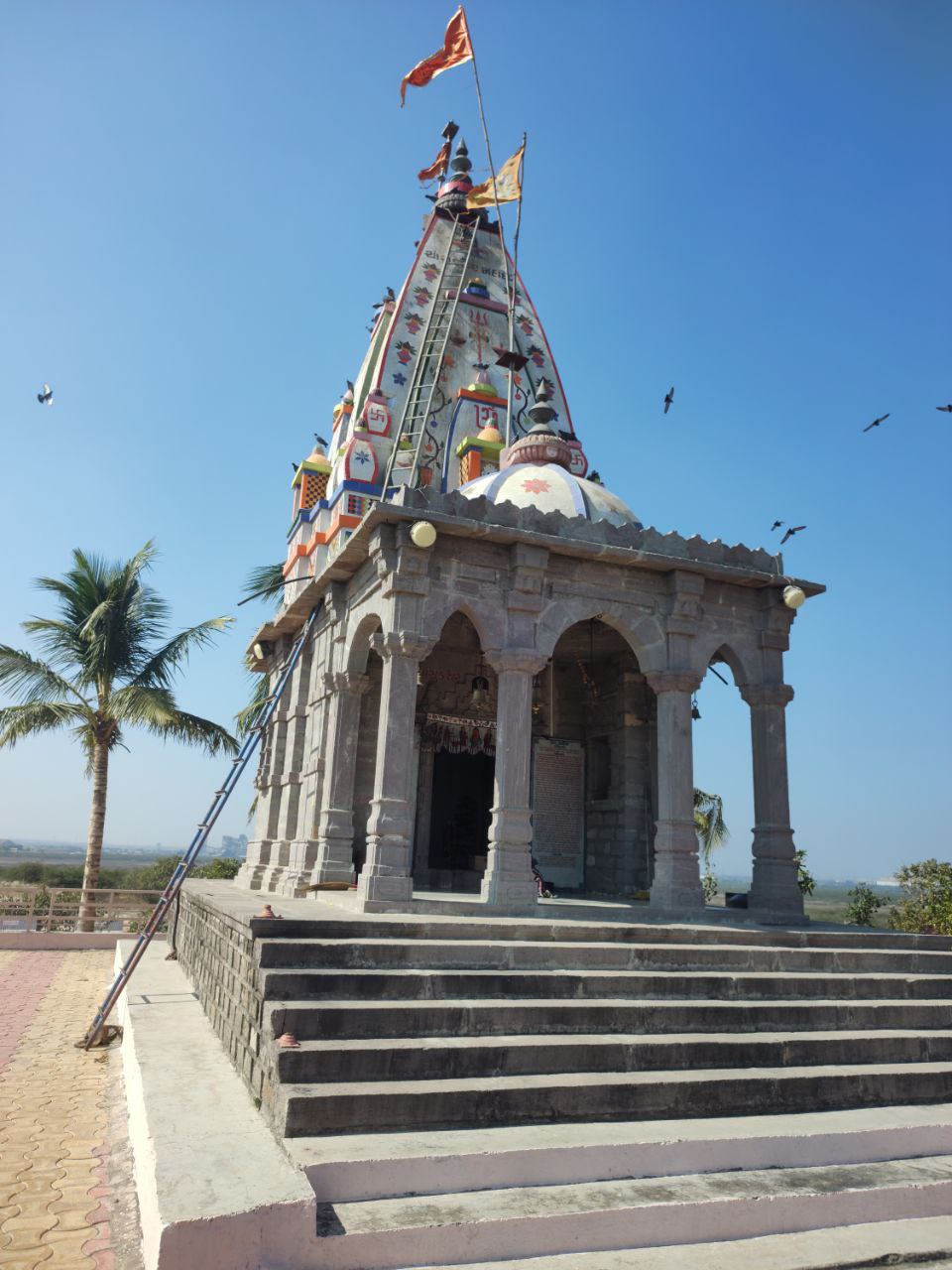
Chachudeshwar temple, Rajula

Kumbhnath Sukhnath temple is situated near Rajula. It is an old temple of Shiva. The shivlinga of Shiva was made by the brothers Bhima and Yudhishthira. Fairs are generally organised on the festivals of Raksha Bandhan and Krishna Janmashtami.The temple is situated at the bank of Ghano river, a tributary of Dhatarwadi river.

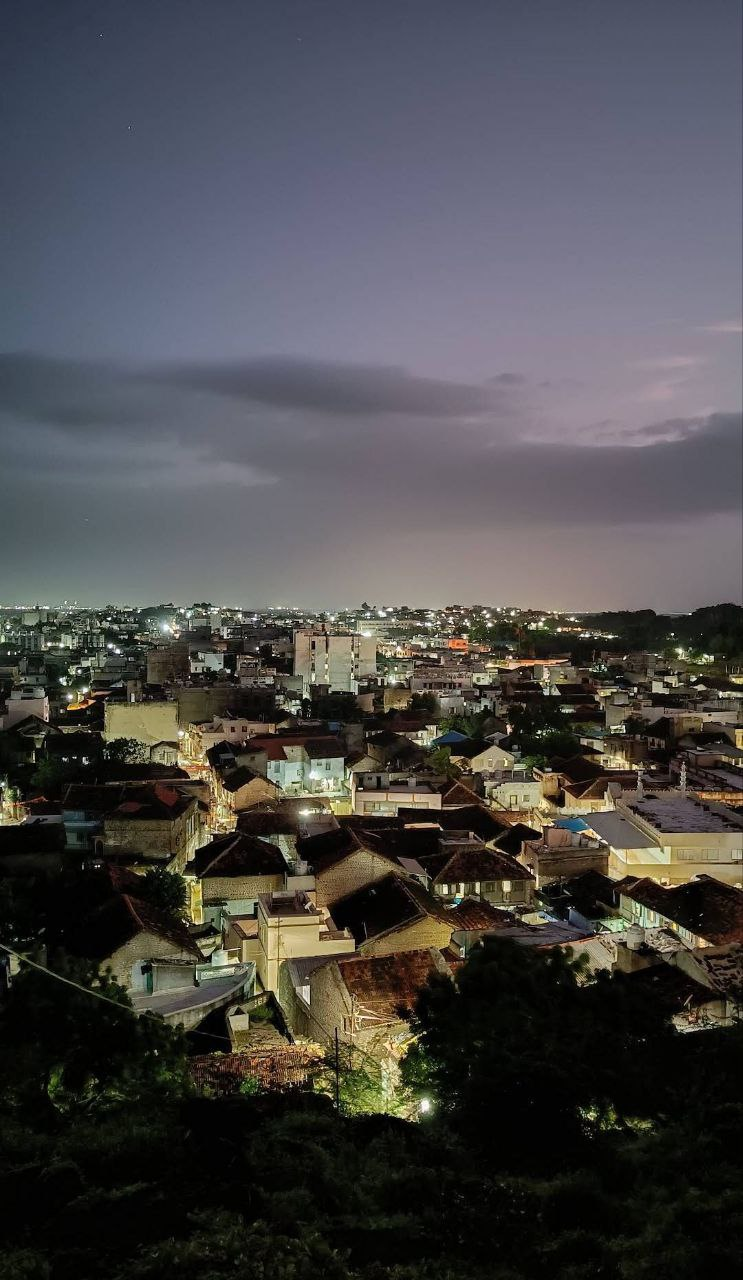
nigh view of rajula city

Other temples include Bhidbhanjan, Ram Mandir, Goverdhannathji Ni Haveli, Samudrimataji Mandir, Sanyas Ashram, Gayatrijinu Mandir, Holia Hanumanji Nu Mandir, Ambama Nu Mandir, and Sankheshwarimataji Mandir.

Dhatarwadi riverside, opposite to the Kumbhnath Temple, is a tourist attraction.

Chachudeshwar Mahadev Temple, about 10 km from the city, is in a coastal area at which the river Dhatarwadi meets the Arabian sea.

== Education ==
The Saraswati group of schools includes Saraswati Vidyalaya, Saraswati Day School, and Saraswati Science School.

Swa. Khodabapa Education Trust and Rajula Sanchalit Sanskruti Vidhyalay and Sanskruti English medium schools are located at Jafrabad Road and have provided education since 2003.

St. Thomas High School is managed by a Christian Catholic group. It is located at Chataddiya Road. Shree Swaminarayan Gurukul is a well-known school and the first private school in the city located at Chataddiya Road, providing education services since 1996.

The city hosts primary schools and bal mandirs. Gandhi mandir is managed by Shri Rajula Seva Mandal. The high school is Shree Jivanlal Anandaji Sanghavi & Shree T.J.B.S. Girls' School is located here. Rajula Education Trust's Smt. Hiralaxmi Bhaidas Sanghavi Mahila Arts & Commerce College is also one of the colleges here. Separate schools, colleges and hostels for girls are available along with coeducational schools.

Calorx Public School is managed by Calorx Education and Research Foundation. It is located at Chataddiya Road.

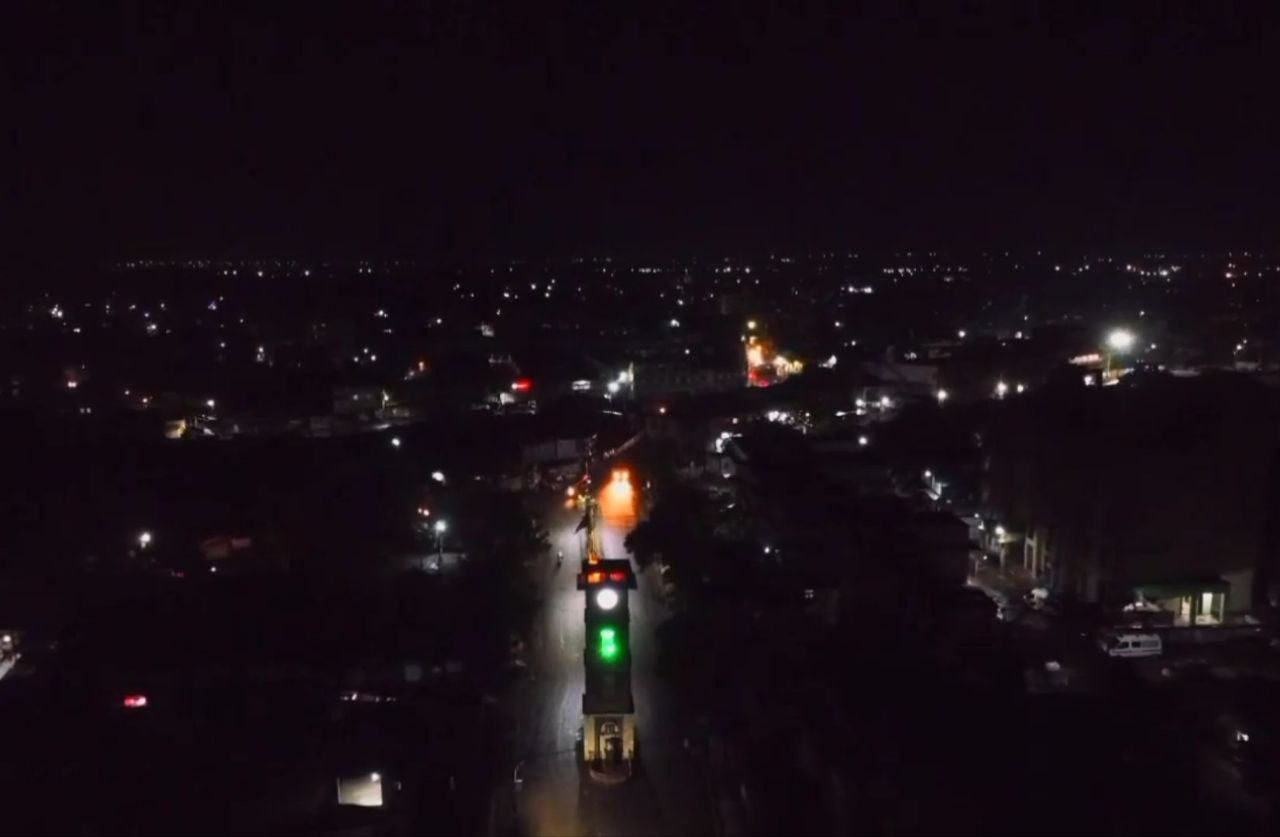
mohan tower rajula

In the year of 2016, Education Department (Government of Gujarat) and Gujarat Maritime Board (GMB) have established GMB Polytechnic, Rajula at Chhatdiya Village (approx. 3 km from Rajula bus stand) to impart technical education of diploma level for the surrounding 100 km.

== Transport ==
The city is well connected with rest of the country by railways, bus transport and sea transport to other major cities of Gujarat such as Rajkot, Jamnagar and Bhavnagar.

In 2023 airport authority of India had announced green field airport at Rajula in list of 11 new airports of gujrat.

Night sleeper coach private buses running from Una or Diu to major cities like Ahmedabad, Baroda, Surat and Mumbai pass through Rajula providing a pleasure journey from Rajula to these cities. Rajula is situated on national highway No. 51. This highway connects Bhavnagar with Veraval.

== Economy ==
The city has substantial rock quarries that export around the country. Its economy mainly depends on industries and agriculture. Crops such as groundnut, cotton, and onion are popular.

Port Pipavav is a busy and growing seaport, with both major cargo operations and a shipyard operated by one of the India's largest shipbuilding and heavy industry companies.

Kovaya village, known for limestone mine reserves, has some of the largest cement manufacturing plants.

== Towns and villages in Rajula Taluka of Amreli district (as per Census 2011) ==
Sr .No	Villages	Population
1	Agariya Dhudiya	2,528
2	Agariya Mota	1,818
3	Agariya Nava	1,508
4	Amuli	332
5	Babariyadhar	2,569
6	Balapar	851
7	Barbatana	2,506
8	Barpatoli	4,026
9	Bhachadar	840
10	Bhakshi	1,446
11	Bherai	4,185
12	Chanch	5,830
13	Charodiya	1,288
14	Chhapri	1,086
15	Chhatadiya	1,171
16	Chotra	1,655
17	Dantardi	2,393
18	Devka	1,788
19	Dharano Nes	363
20	Dhareshvar	2,940
21	Dipadiya	1,087
22	Doliya	2,328
23	Dungar	7,129
24	Dungarparda	680
25	Ganjavadar	215
26	Hadmatiya	601
27	Hindorna	3,117
28	Jholapar	1,036
29	Kadiyali	2,783
30	Katar	3,703
31	Kathivadar	1,623
32	Khakhbai	3,118
33	Khambhaliya	1,093
34	Khari	919
35	khera	4,191
36	Kherali Moti	1,480
37	Kherali Nani	1,040
38	Kotdi	4,923
39	Kovaya	4,061
40	Kumbhariya	1,217
41	Kundaliyala	2,333
42	Majadar	611
43	Mandal	3,684
44	Mandardi Navi-Juni	2,432
45	Masundada Nana- Mota	778
46	Mobhiyana Mota	279
47	Mobhiyana Nana	280
48	Morangi	3,496
49	Navagam	476
50	Nesdi No -1	365
51	Ningala No-1	1,000
52	Patva	2,013
53	Pipavav	1,858
54	Rabhda	1,266
55	Rajparda	1,179
56	Rampara No-1	342
57	Rampara No-2	3,559
58	Ringaniyala Mota	1,268
59	Ringaniyala Nana	59
60	Sajanavav	1,181
61	Samadhiyala No-1	2,427
62	Uchaiya	914
63	Untiya	955
64	Vad	1,025
65	Vadli	2,405
66	Vavdi	1,672
67	Vavera	3,644
68	Victar	2,040
69	Visaliya	2,958
70	Zampodar	645
71	Zanzarda	1,215
72	Zinzka	1,378
