= Port Pipavav =

Port of Pipavav
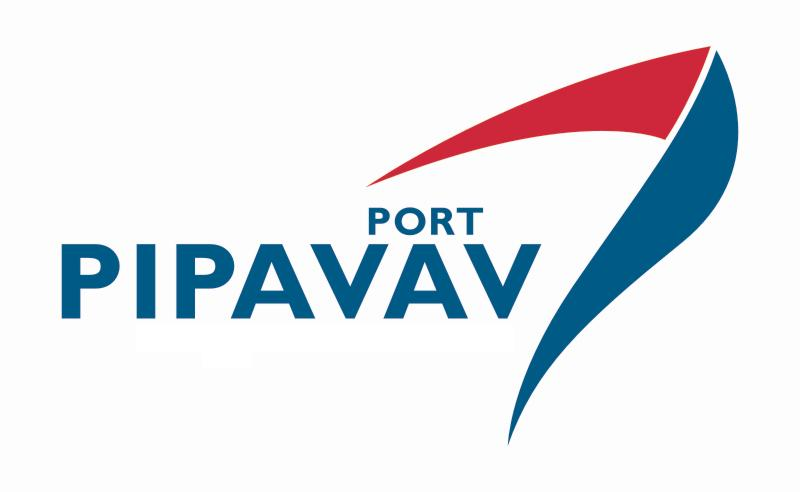

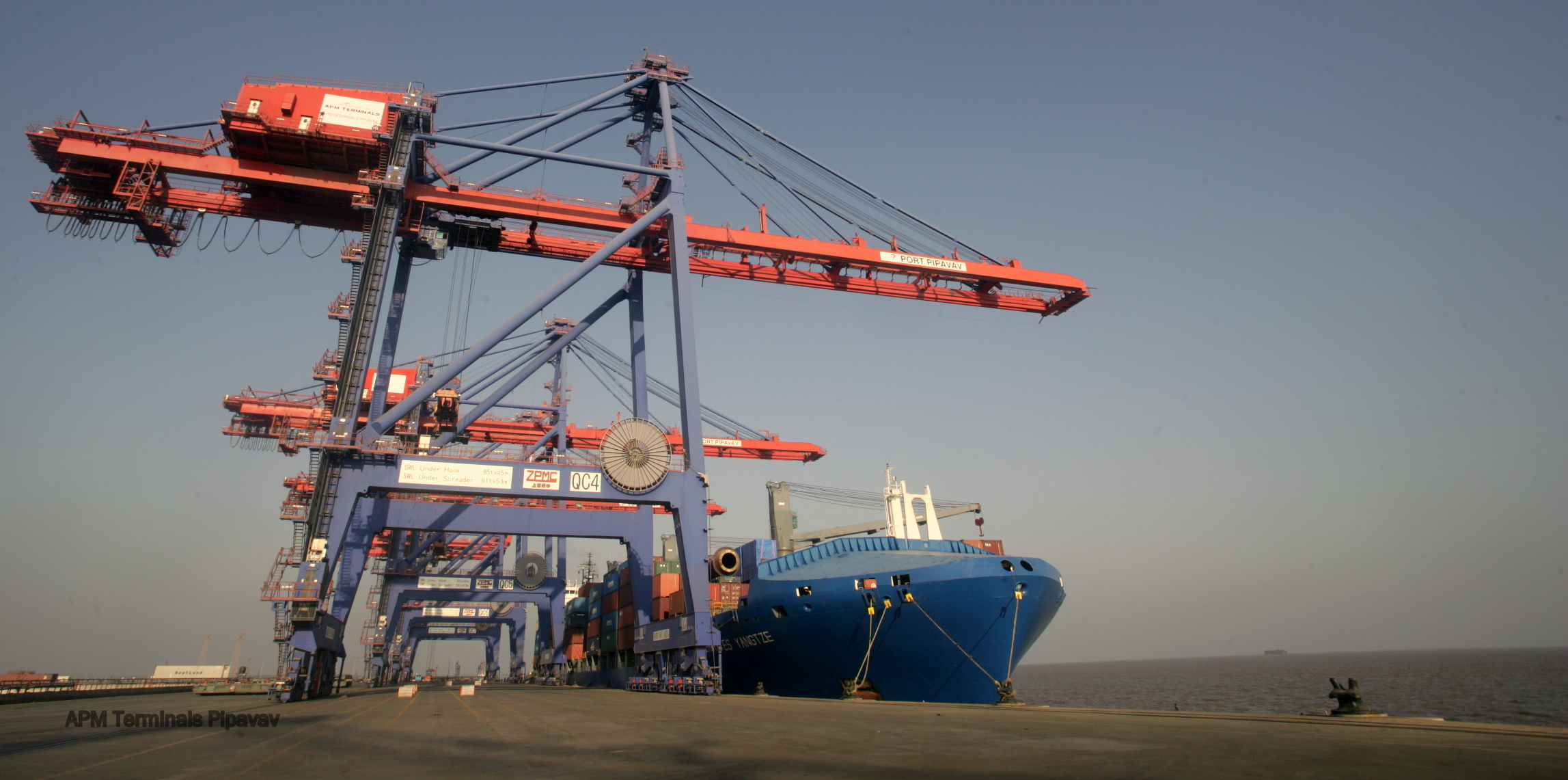
- Ship docked at a container berth
- Interactive map of Port of Pipavav

Location
- Country: India
- Location: Rajula, Gujarat
- Coordinates: 20°55′8″N 71°30′15″E
- UN/LOCODE: INPAV

Details
- Opened: 2002 (Commercial operations)
- Operated by: APM Terminals
- Owned by: Gujarat Pipavav Port Limited (GPPL)
- Type of Harbor: Deep water
- No. of berths: 4 container berths, 2 bulk berths, 1 liquid cargo jetty, 1 ro-ro jetty
- Draft depth: 14.5 m (48 ft) maximum

Port Pipavav is a multi-user, multi-commodity, all weather port on the west coast of India in the Saurashtra region of Gujarat, earlier known as Rajula Port was renamed in 1963-64. It is 90 km South of Amreli, 15 km South of Rajula and 140 km Southwest of Bhavnagar.

The port has cargo operations for containers, bulk, liquid and roll-on/roll-off cargo and an adjoining shipyard that builds naval vessels.

== History ==
=== Cargo port ===
In 1986 the Indian government authorized an expenditure of 5 million rupees to initiate port development near the village of Pipavav in the Amreli district of the state of Gujarat in India. The company GPPL was incorporated on 5 August 1992 to build, construct, operate and maintain the port. The company was initially a joint venture between Gujarat Maritime Board (GMB) and the SKIL Ports & Logistics division of the SKIL Infrastructure group (now known as Mercantile Ports and Logistics (MPL)).

In June 1998, GMB divested its stake in favour of SKIL Ports & Logistics. In 2000, GPPL formed a joint venture with Indian Railways to start Pipavav Rail Corporation Limited. Commercial operations started in 2002.

The A.P. Moller-Maersk Group acquired a 13.5% equity interest in the company in June 2001. Pursuant to the share sale and purchase agreement dated 30 March 2005, SKIL Infrastructure, Nikhil Gandhi, Montana Valves and Compressors and Grevek Investment and Finance divested their shareholding in the company in favour of APM Terminals.

=== Shipyard ===
Construction of a shipyard adjoining the port was completed in 2010 by Pipavav Defence and Offshore Engineering Company Limited. In 2011 the shipyard won its first contract to build warships for the Indian Navy.

The shipyard company was renamed to Reliance Defence and Engineering on 3 March 2016 and again renamed to Reliance Naval and Engineering Limited on 6 September 2017. In January 2025 the company was renamed to Swan Defence and Heavy Industries Limited.

== Shialbet island ==
Shialbet island is a natural breakwater facing the wharves of the port. It is inhabited by a small fishing community and is connected to the mainland.

== Cargo operations ==
Gujarat Pipavav Port Limited
- Trade name: APM Terminals Pipavav
- Type: Public
- Traded as: BSE: 533248; NSE: GPPL
- Industry: Transport, Port Terminals
- Founded: 5 August 1992; 34 years ago
- Founder: Gujarat Maritime Board (GMB)
- Headquarters: Rajula, Gujarat
- Key people: Keld Pedersen (MD); Hariharan Iyer (CFO); Ravindranath Pillarisetti(Head-Port Infrastructure & Facility)
- Website: http://www.pipavav.com

The cargo port is owned by the public company Gujarat Pipavav Port Limited (GPPL), and is operated by their majority owner APM Terminals, who are one of the largest container terminal operators in the world. Container, bulk, liquid, LPG an Roll-on/roll-off cargo can be handled. Services provided include pilotage/towage, cargo handling and logistics support.

=== Port characteristics ===
The port is along major trade routes and is close to the major Indian port of Nhava Sheva (about 160 Nm). It has been dredged to allow a maximum draft of 14.5 metres (48 ft). There are 8 quay cranes for containers, 2 mobile harbor cranes for handling bulk cargo, 4 rail mounted gantry cranes and 20 Rubber tyred gantry cranes.

For refrigerated shipping, the port is operated by a single entity i.e. it is a captive port.
