= Chanch, Gujarat =

Village in Gujarat, India

Coordinates: 20.9565°N 71.5067°E

Chanch is a coastal village in Rajula Taluka of Amreli district, Gujarat, India, Asia.It is a famous tourist spot too. It has a famous Port which is its identity.

== Geography ==
Chanch is situated near the mouth of the Motapat creek, on a rock on the shore of the Arabian Sea.

== History ==
The village probably derives its name from beak shaped seacoast, literally Chanch in Gujarati.

Chanch was formerly infamous for it pirates so much that Gujarati term Chanchia became synonymous with pirate.

== Demographics ==
It had a population of 130 in 1880s. It has now population of around 13000 which lives in scattered houses in seven clusters.

== Economy ==
Fishery and labour in saltpans is major source of income. Pearls are found in the Chanch creek.

== Education ==
The village has three primary schools.

== Places of interest ==
There was a famous Baobab tree at Chanch, about 100 feet in circumference at a height of four feet from the ground. It was at least 2000 years old, and possibly was planted by one of the old navigators to or from the African coast. The tree is not considered indigenous to India, though found in many places. Usually, however, it is found growing near the coast. There are two or three of these trees growing along the southern coast of Saurashtra such as in Mahuva. It fell down in storm later.

There is a bungalow on seashore built by Krishna Kumarsinhji Bhavsinhji of Bhavnagar State. The construction was started in 1945 and ended after 10 years at the cost of Rupees 20 Lakh. It has 88 rooms.
