= 2001 Gujarat cyclone =

North Indian cyclone in 2001

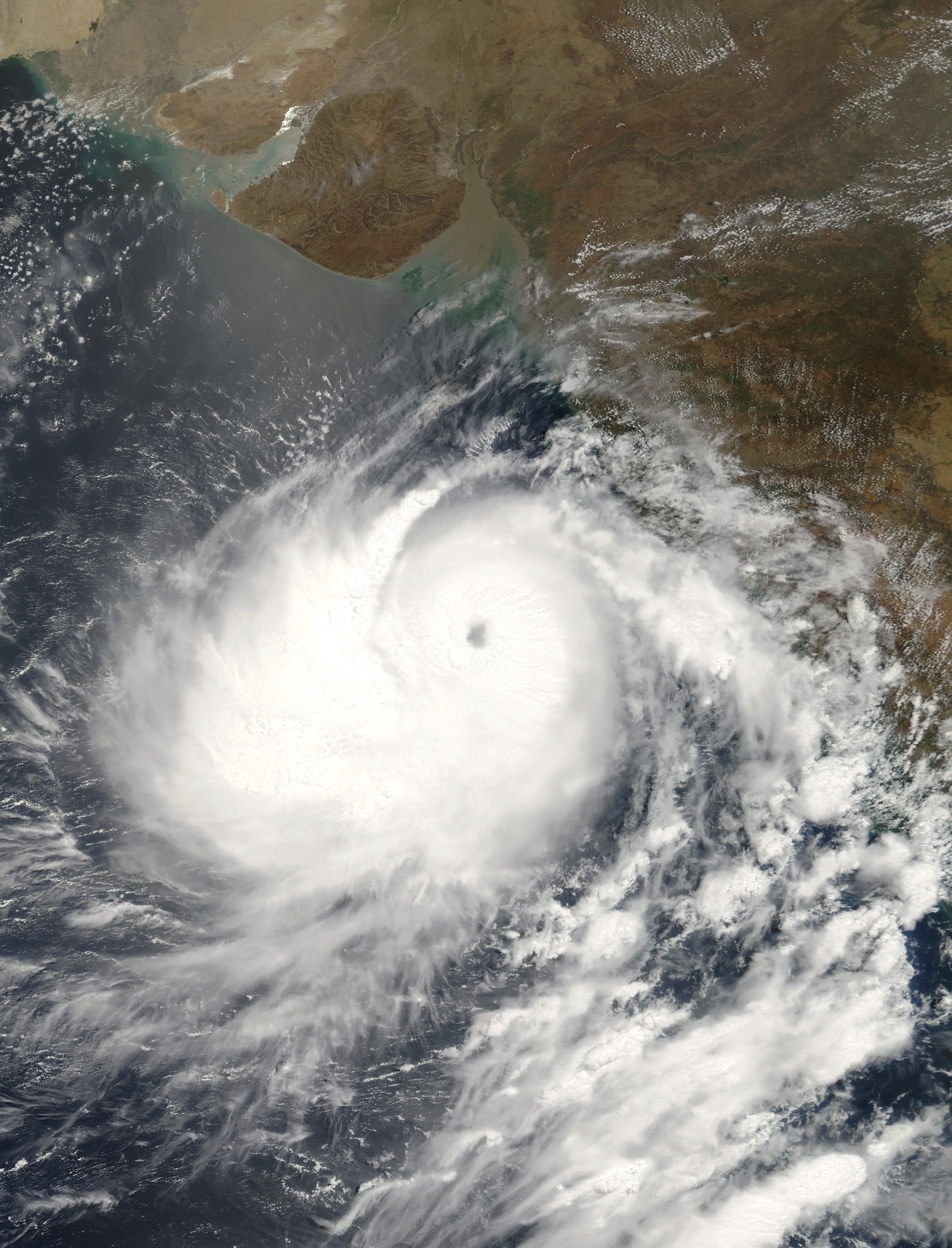
- The cyclone shortly before peak intensity on 23 May

Meteorological history
- Formed: 21 May 2001
- Dissipated: 29 May 2001

Extremely severe cyclonic storm
- 3-minute sustained (IMD)
- Highest winds: 215 km/h (130 mph)
- Lowest pressure: 932 hPa (mbar); 27.52 inHg

Category 3-equivalent tropical cyclone
- 1-minute sustained (SSHWS/JTWC)
- Highest winds: 205 km/h (125 mph)
- Lowest pressure: 927 hPa (mbar); 27.37 inHg

Overall effects
- Casualties: 120–900 dead or missing
- Damage: Minimal
- Areas affected: Western India
- IBTrACS /
- Part of the 2001 North Indian Ocean cyclone season

The 2001 Gujarat cyclone was the third strongest tropical cyclone, in terms of barometric pressure, to form in the Arabian Sea on record; only Cyclones Gonu in 2007 and Kyarr in 2019 were stronger. The storm originated from a tropical disturbance that formed east of Somalia on 18 May. Over the following few days, the system gradually organized into a tropical depression. Tracking eastward, towards the coastline of southwestern India, the storm slowly intensified. Shortly before reaching shore, the system turned north and later west, away from land. After taking this turn, the storm intensified into a very severe cyclonic storm, attaining its peak intensity on 24 May with winds of 215 km/h (130 mph 3-minute winds) and a barometric pressure of 932 mbar (hPa). At the time, this ranked the cyclone as the strongest known storm in the Arabian Sea.

After stalling several hundred kilometres offshore, the storm weakened over cooler waters that it had upwelled. By 27 May, the system weakened to a cyclonic storm and by this time was approaching the northwestern coastline of India, near Gujarat. The following day, the storm made landfall in the Saurashtra region as a deep depression with winds of 55 km/h (35 mph 3-minute winds). The depression quickly weakened after moving inland and dissipated early on 29 May.

Although a powerful cyclone over water, the storm had relatively little impact over land. In the Valsad district, two coastal communities lost a combined 200 homes due to large swells produced by the storm. However, the losses were more extensive offshore. Between 120 and 900 fishermen were listed as missing after contact was lost with their vessels during the storm.

== Meteorological history ==
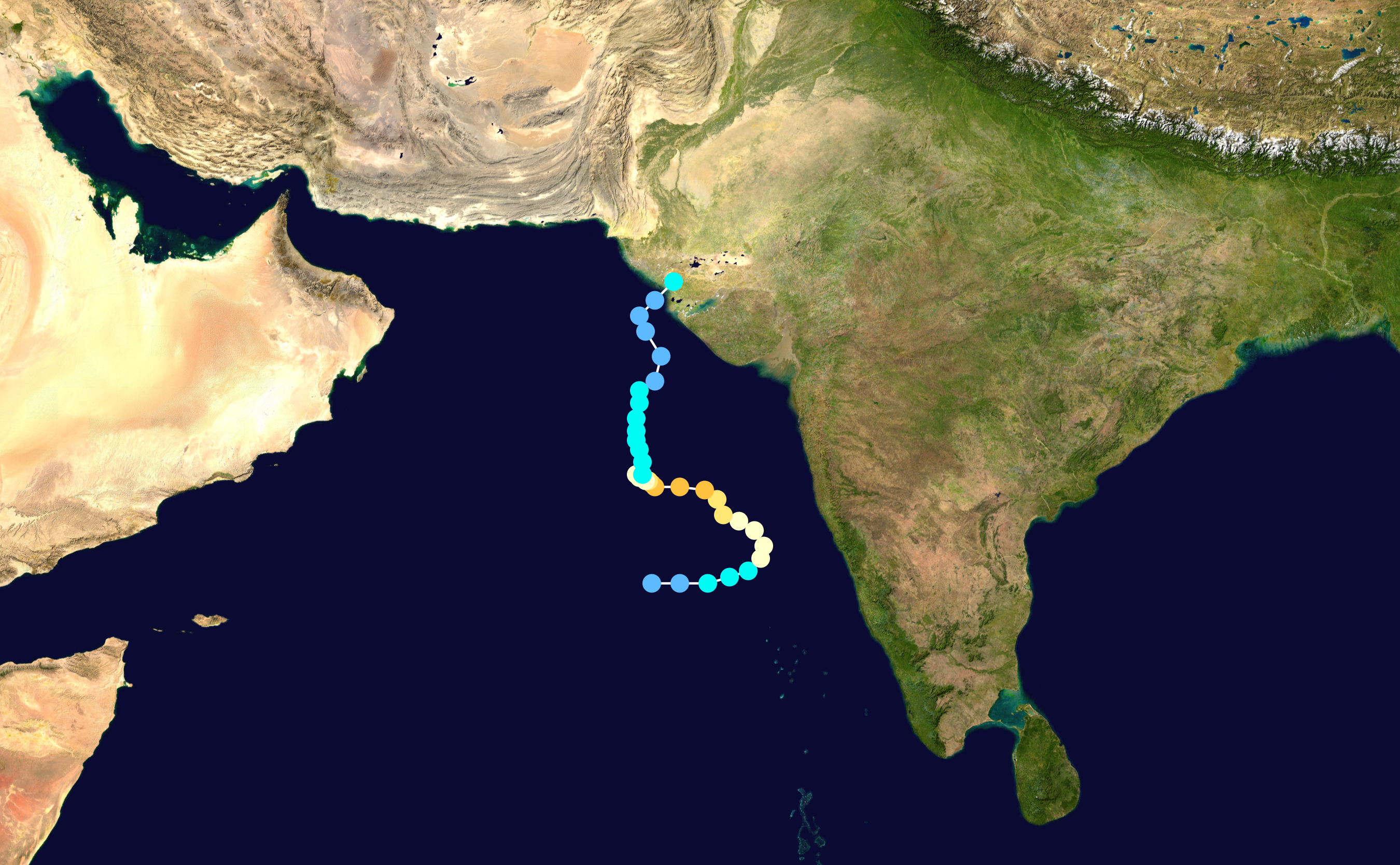
Map plotting the storm's track and intensity, according to the Saffir–Simpson scale Map key Saffir–Simpson scale Tropical depression (≤38 mph, ≤62 km/h) Tropical storm (39–73 mph, 63–118 km/h) Category 1 (74–95 mph, 119–153 km/h) Category 2 (96–110 mph, 154–177 km/h) Category 3 (111–129 mph, 178–208 km/h) Category 4 (130–156 mph, 209–251 km/h) Category 5 (≥157 mph, ≥252 km/h) Unknown Storm type Tropical cyclone Subtropical cyclone Extratropical cyclone, remnant low, tropical disturbance, or monsoon depression

The origins of the 2001 Gujarat cyclone can be traced to a tropical disturbance over the Arabian Sea on 18 May. The following day, the system was determined to be relatively stationary near the island of Socotra. Although deep convection was associated with the disturbance, there was no evidence of a low-level circulation. By 20 May, the disturbance slowly moved towards the southeast in response to an upper-level trough over India. The overall structure gradually improved as good outflow developed. A mid-level circulation finally developed late on 21 May, prompting the Joint Typhoon Warning Center (JTWC) to issue a Tropical Cyclone Formation Alert. Several hours later, they began monitoring the system as a tropical depression with the identifier 01A; however, operational advisories were not issued until the cyclone was estimated to have attained tropical storm intensity. By the morning of 22 May, the India Meteorological Department (IMD) also took notice of the system.

Situated in a region favoring tropical cyclone development about 650 km (400 mi) southwest of Mumbai, India, the storm rapidly developed. By the afternoon of 22 May, the JTWC estimated that 01A attained winds of 120 km/h (75 mph), equivalent to a Category 1 hurricane on the Saffir–Simpson hurricane scale. Additionally, a 22 km (14 mi)-wide eye developed within the center of circulation during this intensification phase. Throughout most of 22 May, the strengthening slowed considerably as it paralleled the southwestern coast of India. Initially, it was feared that the storm would move inland as a powerful cyclone; however, a ridge over the northern Arabian Sea caused the storm to turn westward, back over open water. Once further away from land, the cyclone resumed intensification, becoming a rare, Category 3 equivalent storm by the morning of 24 May. Later that morning, 01A attained its peak intensity with winds of 205 km/h (125 mph), according to the JTWC. However, the IMD considered the storm to be slightly stronger, estimating that it attained winds of 215 km/h (135 mph) by three-minute sustained winds along with a barometric pressure of 932 mbar (hPa; 27.52 inHg).

At the time of peak intensity, the cyclone displayed a well-defined eye and excellent outflow. Although a powerful storm, it quickly weakened as conditions became hostile for tropical cyclone development. Strong wind shear tore convection away from the cyclone and caused it to become disorganized. Within 48 hours, the system had degraded to a tropical storm and was situated roughly 555 km (345 mi) west-southwest of Mumbai. The weakening trend lessened shortly thereafter but still continued. Operationally, the JTWC issued their final advisory on the cyclone on 28 May as it weakened to a tropical depression over open waters. The once powerful cyclone, now devoid of all convection, tracked towards the northwestern coast of India. During the afternoon of 29 May, the cyclone rapidly regenerated as it made landfall in Gujarat. The JTWC estimated that it crossed the coastline with winds of 100 km/h (60 mph). Not long after moving overland, the system rapidly weakened and dissipated over India within several hours.

== Preparations and impact ==
Ahead of the storm, all ports in Gujarat, including Kandla, one of the largest in the country, were closed as a precautionary measure. On 25 May, over 10,000 people were evacuated from coastal areas in the threatened region. Throughout India, a total of 118,800 people were evacuated and 100,000 more were evacuated in Pakistan. The Indian military was placed on standby to undertake search-and-rescue missions immediately after the storms' passage. Fourteen districts of Gujarat were placed on red alert, the highest level of preparedness. Seven emergency control centers were set up across the country and officials alerted hospitals and fire crews about the approaching storm.

Several relief agencies were already positioned in the region in response to a magnitude 7.7 earthquake in January of that year that killed over 20,000 people. Additional disaster relief teams were deployed to the region to further prepare residents for the cyclone. Food, water and other necessities were stored and ready to be provided to victims of the storm. Large swells produced by the storm affected a large portion of the western Indian coastline, especially in the city of Bombay. In the Valsad district, two coastal communities lost a combined 200 homes due to large swells produced by the storm. Offshore, between 1,500 and 2,000 fishing vessels had lost contact with the mainland. Later reports indicated that between 120 and 900 fishermen had gone missing as a result of the cyclone.

== Records ==
Operationally, the cyclone was considered to be a Category 4 equivalent storm by the JTWC, with peak winds of 215 km/h (135 mph). This would have made the system the first recorded storm of that intensity on record in the Arabian Sea. However, in post-storm analysis, it was discovered that 1-minute winds did not exceed 205 km/h (125 mph). The next storm to reach this intensity was Cyclone Gonu in 2007 North Indian Ocean cyclone season, which became the first known super cyclonic storm in the region. Upon attaining its peak intensity, the storm attained a barometric pressure of 932 mbar (hPa), the lowest in the region at the time. The cyclone was ranked as the strongest in the Arabian Sea for six years until it was surpassed by Gonu in 2007, which attained a minimum pressure of 920 mbar (hPa). In 2010, Cyclone Phet surpassed the 2001 cyclone as the second-strongest storm in the region, attaining winds of 230 km/h (145 mph), according to the JTWC. Again it was surpassed to sixth place as Cyclone Kyarr, Cyclone Chapala, Cyclone Tauktae and Cyclone Nilofar surpassed its windspeed intensity as they become category 4 tropical cyclones in later years. Now this cyclone is tied with Cyclone Megh for sixth strongest cyclone in Arabian Sea based on windspeed of one minute mean.

== See also ==
- 2001 North Indian Ocean cyclone season
- List of Gujarat tropical cyclones
- Cyclone Gonu
- Cyclone Biparjoy
- List of the most intense tropical cyclones
