= 2001 North Indian Ocean cyclone season =

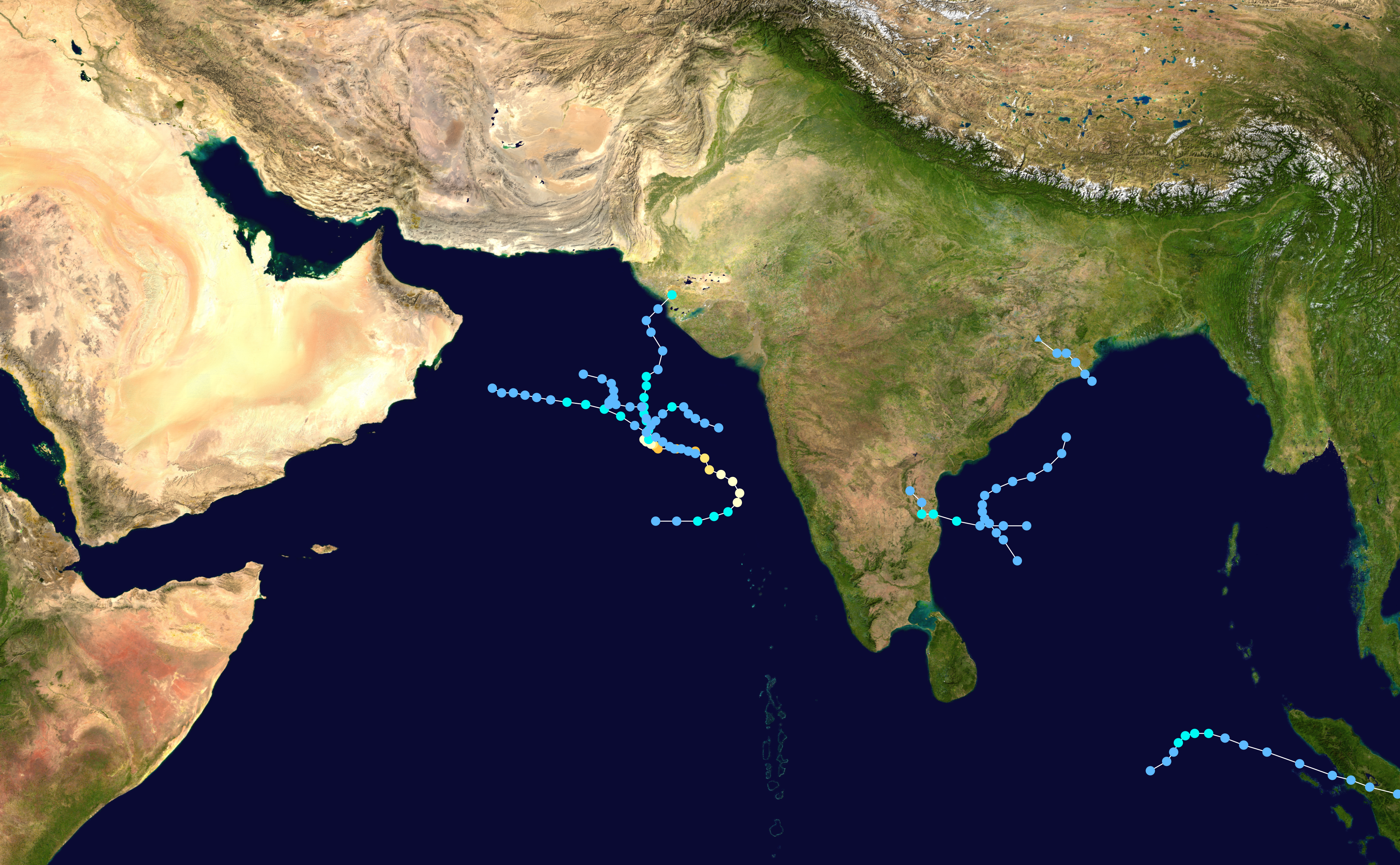
- Season summary map

Seasonal boundaries
- First system formed: May 21, 2001
- Last system dissipated: November 12, 2001 (January 1, 2002 per JTWC)

Strongest storm
- Name: ARB 01
  - Maximum winds: 215 km/h (130 mph) (3-minute sustained)
  - Lowest pressure: 932 hPa (mbar)

Seasonal statistics
- Depressions: 6, 1 unofficial
- Deep depressions: 4, 1 unofficial
- Cyclonic storms: 4, 1 unofficial
- Severe cyclonic storms: 1
- Very severe cyclonic storms: 1
- Extremely severe cyclonic storms: 1
- Total fatalities: 273 total
- Total damage: $104 million (2001 USD)

Related articles
- 2001 Atlantic hurricane season; 2001 Pacific hurricane season; 2001 Pacific typhoon season

The 2001 North Indian Ocean cyclone season was fairly quiet, although activity was evenly spread between the Arabian Sea and the Bay of Bengal. There were six depressions tracked by the India Meteorological Department (IMD), which is the official Regional Specialized Meteorological Center for the northern Indian Ocean. The agency also tracked four cyclonic storms, which have maximum winds of at least 65 km/h (40 mph) sustained over 3 minutes. The American-based Joint Typhoon Warning Center (JTWC) tracked an additional storm – Tropical Storm Vamei – which crossed over from the South China Sea at a record-low latitude.

The first storm originated on May 21, and became the strongest recorded storm in the Arabian Sea at the time. The IMD estimated peak 3 minute winds of 215 km/h (135 mph) while the storm was off the west coast of India. The storm weakened greatly before making landfall in Gujarat, and although impact on land was minor, it left up to 950 fishermen missing. A few weeks later, the first Bay of Bengal system originated – a short-lived depression that dropped heavy rainfall upon striking Odisha. After a period of inactivity during the monsoon season, there were cyclonic storms in September and October in the northern Arabian Sea. Both lasted only a few days and dissipated due to unfavorable wind shear. Another cyclonic storm formed in the Bay of Bengal and struck Andhra Pradesh, which dropped heavy rainfall that was equivalent to 300% of the average October precipitation total. The rains caused flooding, particularly in Cuddapah, where a dam was deliberately opened and inundated the town overnight. There were 153 deaths due to the storm and RS5 billion (Indian rupees, US$104 million) in damage. The final storm of the season tracked by the IMD was a short-lived depression in November in the Bay of Bengal.

== Season summary ==
The India Meteorological Department (IMD) in New Delhi – the official Regional Specialized Meteorological Center for the northern Indian Ocean as recognized by the World Meteorological Organization – issued warnings for tropical cyclones developing in the region. The basin's activity is sub-divided between the Arabian Sea and the Bay of Bengal on opposite coasts of India, and is generally split before and after the monsoon season. The IMD utilized satellite imagery to track storms, and used the Dvorak technique to estimate intensity.

Toward the end of the year, convection was generally lower than normal in the Bay of Bengal, despite being a typical hotspot for activity. There were no deaths or damage throughout the year outside of India, and damage there was lower than what occurred in the previous few seasons.

== Systems ==
=== Extremely Severe Cyclonic Storm ARB 01 ===
- Extremely severe cyclonic storm (IMD)
- Category 3 tropical cyclone (SSHWS)
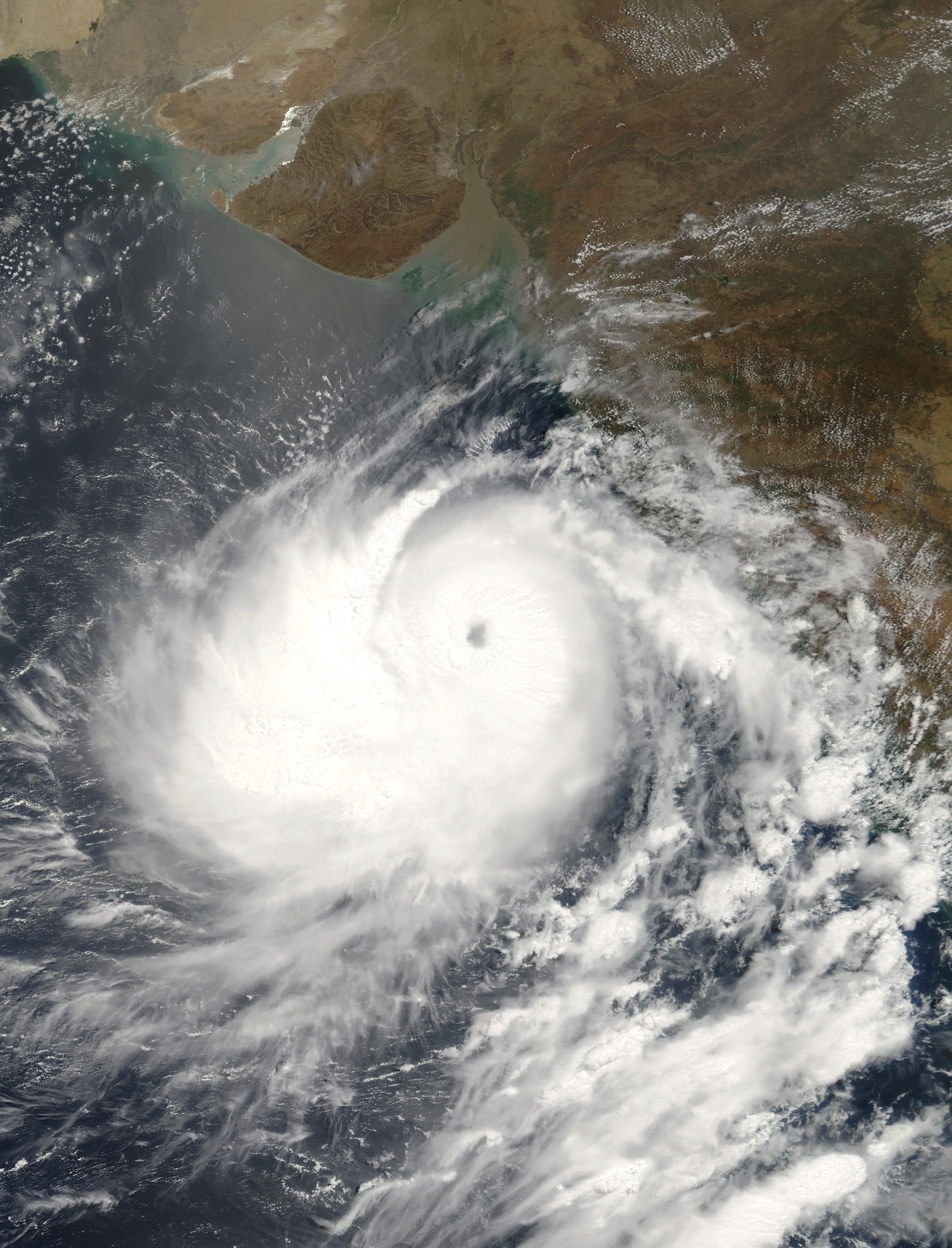
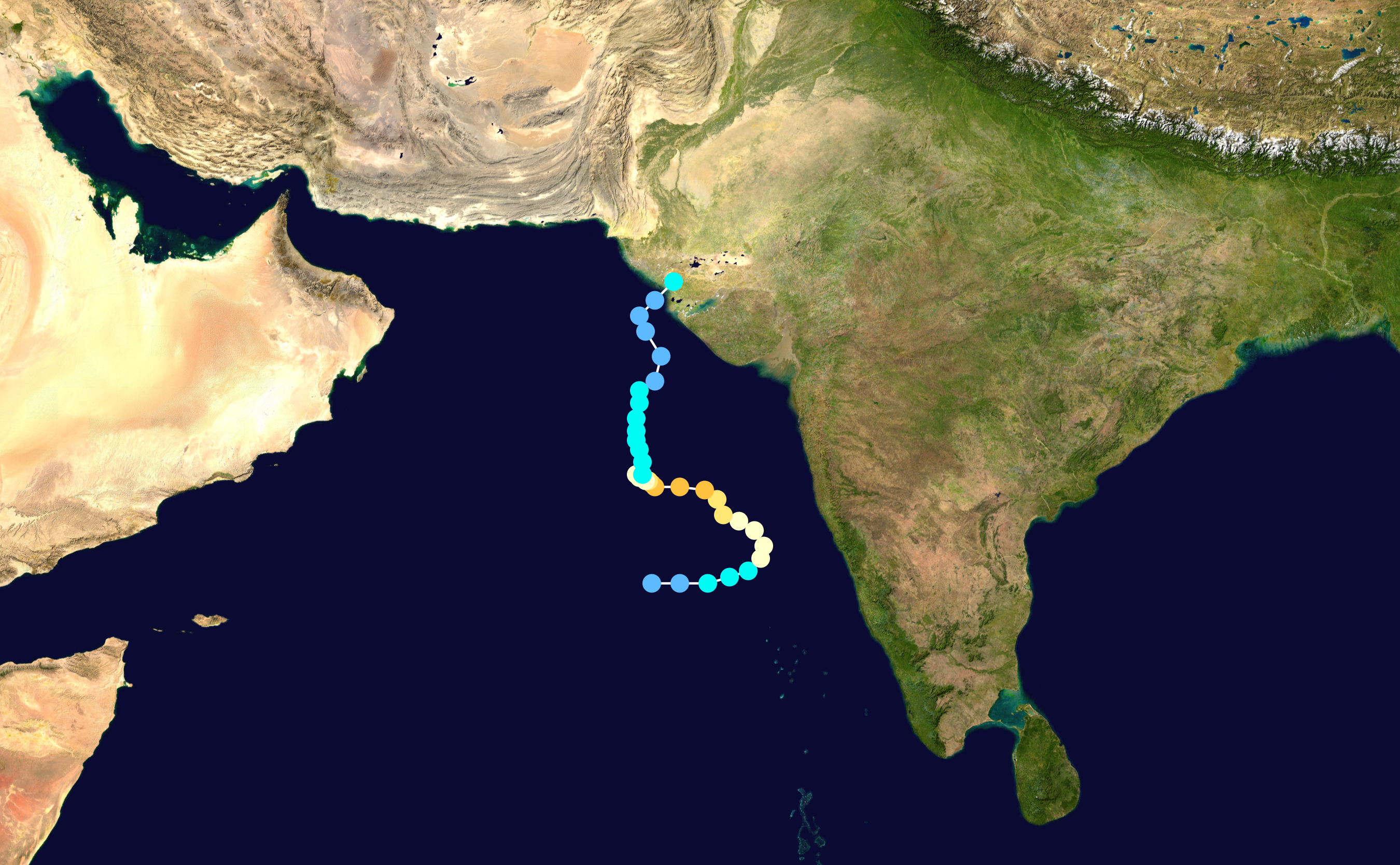
- Duration: May 21 – May 28
- Peak intensity: 215 km/h (130 mph) (3-min); 932 hPa (mbar)

The first storm of the season originated from a tropical disturbance that formed east of Somalia on May 18. Over the following few days, the system gradually organized, becoming a depression on May 21. It moved eastward toward the coastline of southwestern India and rapidly intensified on May 22, strengthening from a deep depression to a very severe cyclonic storm within 24 hours. After approaching the coastline, the storm turned to the north and northwest away from land due to a ridge. Based on the well-defined eye and the storm's satellite presentation, the IMD estimated peak winds of 215 km/h (135 mph) on May 24, and the JTWC estimated 1 minute winds of 205 km/h (125 mph). It became the strongest storm on record in the Arabian Sea, only to be surpassed by Cyclone Gonu in 2007. Soon after reaching peak intensity, the cyclone rapidly weakened as it turned northward. By May 28, it had deteriorated into a deep depression, and the IMD downgraded the storm to a remnant low before the circulation reached the Gujarat coast.

Ahead of the storm, all ports in Gujarat, including Kandla, one of the largest in the country, were closed as a precautionary measure. Over 10,000 people were evacuated from coastal areas in the threatened region. Offshore, between 1,500 and 2,000 fishing vessels lost contact with the mainland immediately after the storm. However, because the storm remained offshore, the coast only experienced minor damage, although rainfall was widespread. About 200 houses were washed away in Kosamba, and one person died in Jamnagar. About 950 fishermen were missing after the storm, which prompted a helicopter search.

=== Cyclonic Storm ARB 02 ===
- Cyclonic storm (IMD)
- Tropical storm (SSHWS)
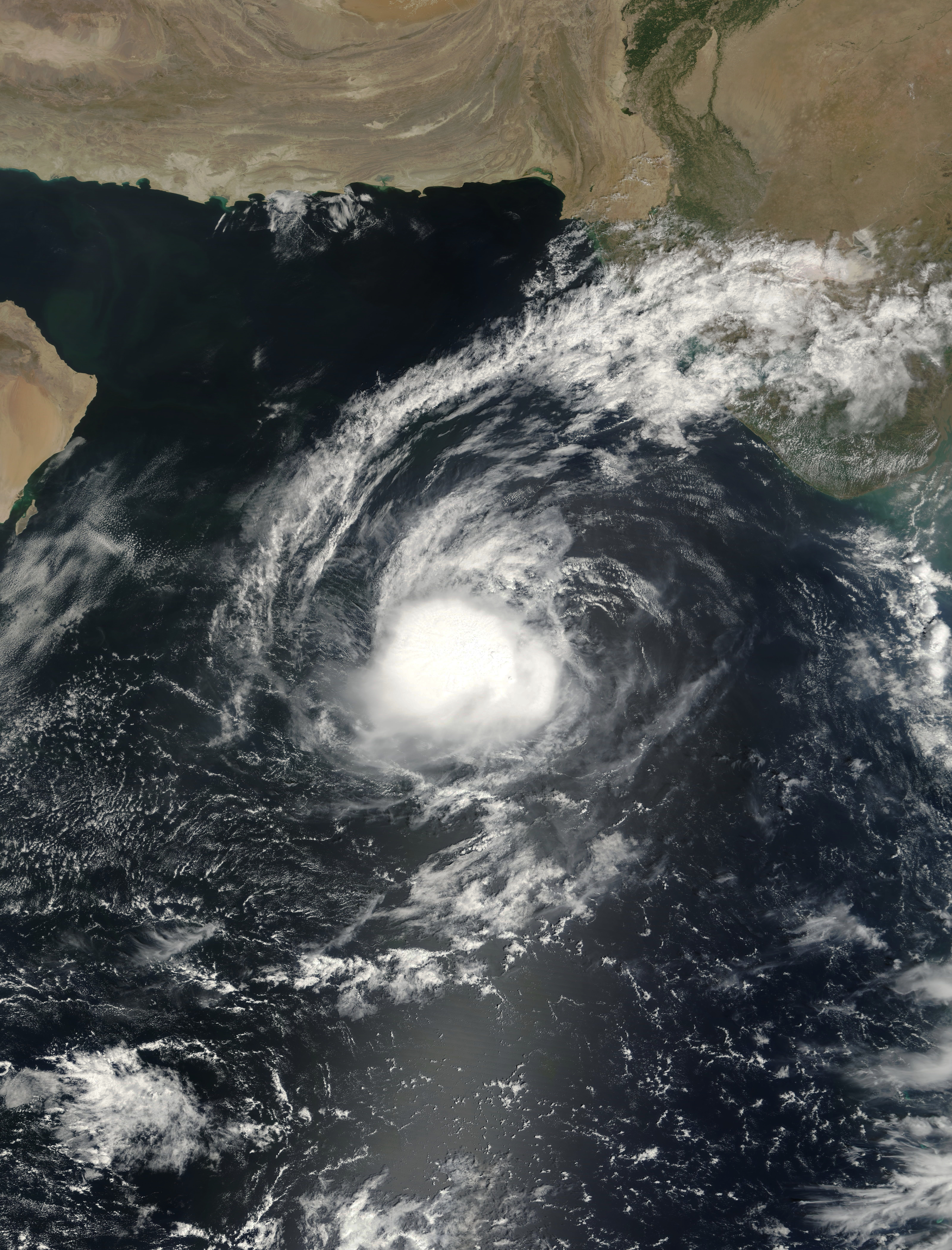
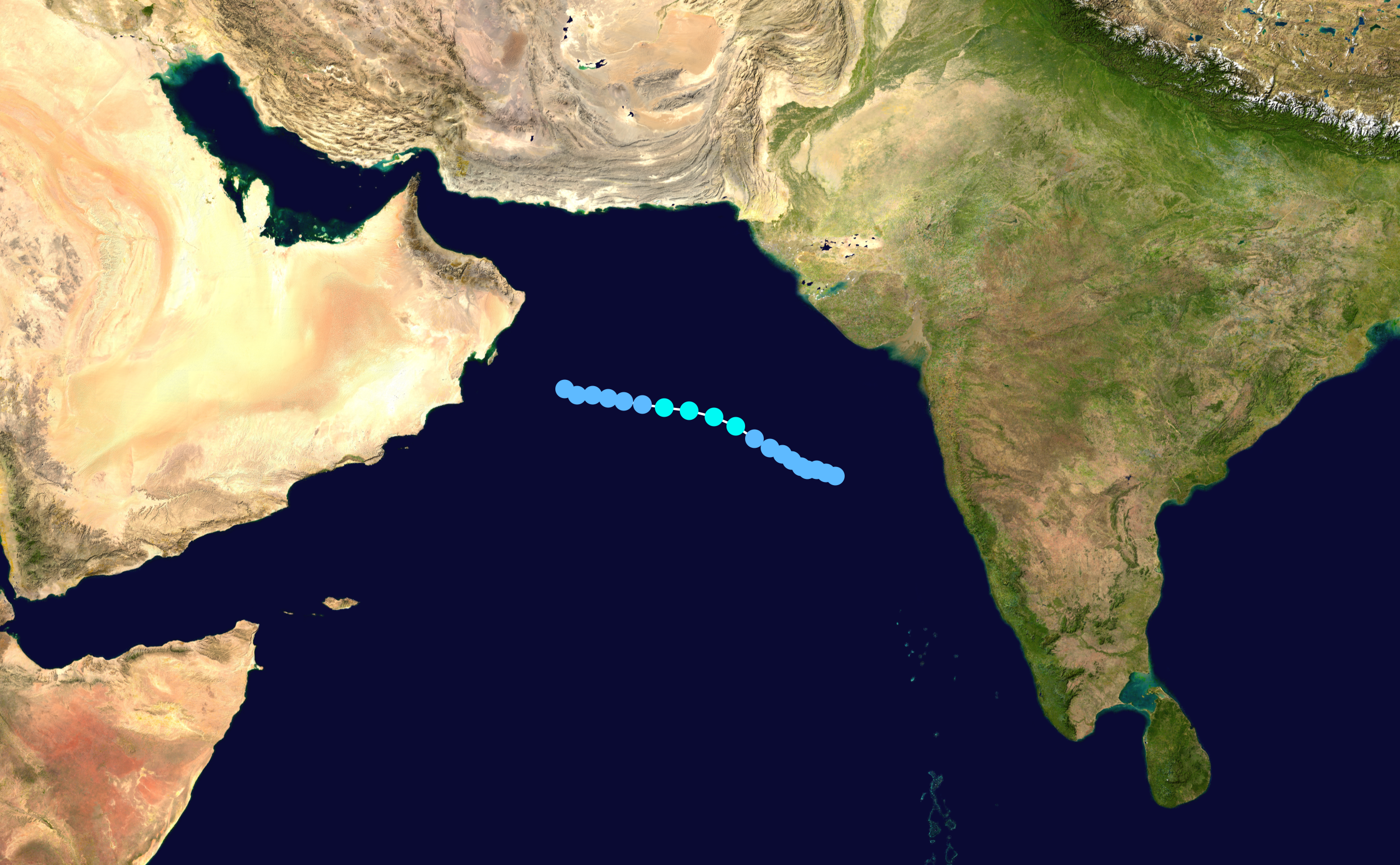
- Duration: September 25 – September 28
- Peak intensity: 65 km/h (40 mph) (3-min); 1000 hPa (mbar)

An upper-level disturbance spawned a low-pressure area in the eastern Arabian Sea on September 24. It initially consisted of a well-defined circulation on the eastern edge of an area of convection about 370 km (230 mi) west-southwest of Mumbai. With low wind shear beneath the subtropical ridge, the system gradually organized and developed curved banding features while moving west-northwestward. At 0900 UTC on September 24, the IMD classified the system as a depression, and nine hours later upgraded it further to a deep depression. On the same day, the JTWC issued a Tropical Cyclone Formation Alert, although they did not begin advisories due to the center being on the east side of the convection. At 0900 UTC on September 25, the IMD upgraded the system to a cyclonic storm, estimating peak winds of 65 km/h (40 mph).

Early on September 26, the circulation moved beneath the convection, prompting the JTWC to begin advisories on Tropical Cyclone 02A. Around that time, the storm's outskirts dropped light rainfall in western India. Forecasters initially anticipated that the storm would strengthen to winds of 95 km/h (60 mph) and strike the southern Arabian Peninsula. However, persistent wind shear dislocated the circulation from the convection and imparted weakening. The IMD downgraded the storm to a deep depression and later depression on September 27, by which time the thunderstorms were rapidly dwindling. The JTWC issued their last advisory on September 28 after the circulation had no nearby convection. At that time, the storm was located 185 km (115 mi) east-southeast of Masirah Island off Oman. The IMD also downgraded the depression to a low-pressure area on September 28 and noted that the remnant system became poorly defined the following day.

=== Cyclonic Storm ARB 03 ===
- Cyclonic storm (IMD)
- Tropical storm (SSHWS)
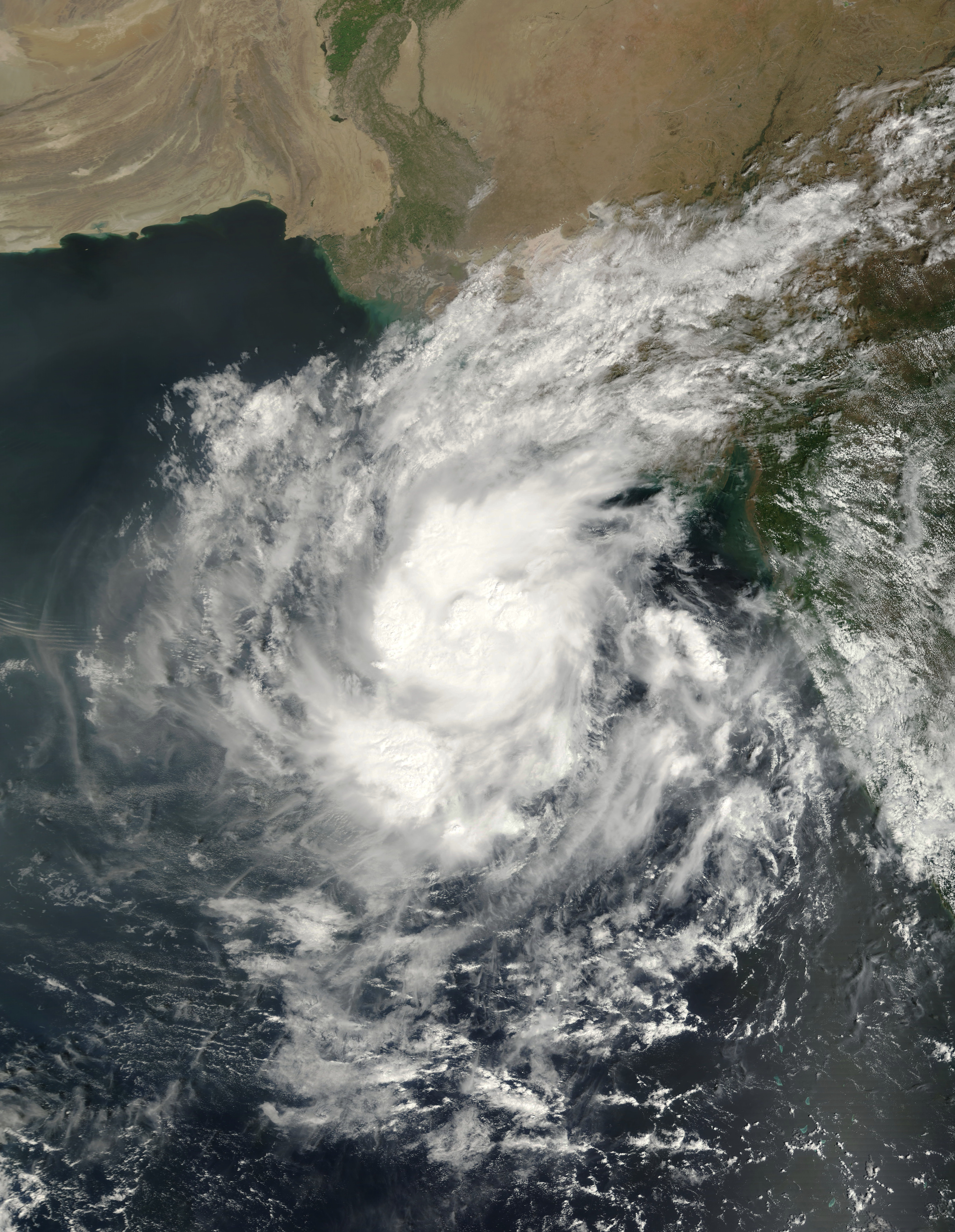
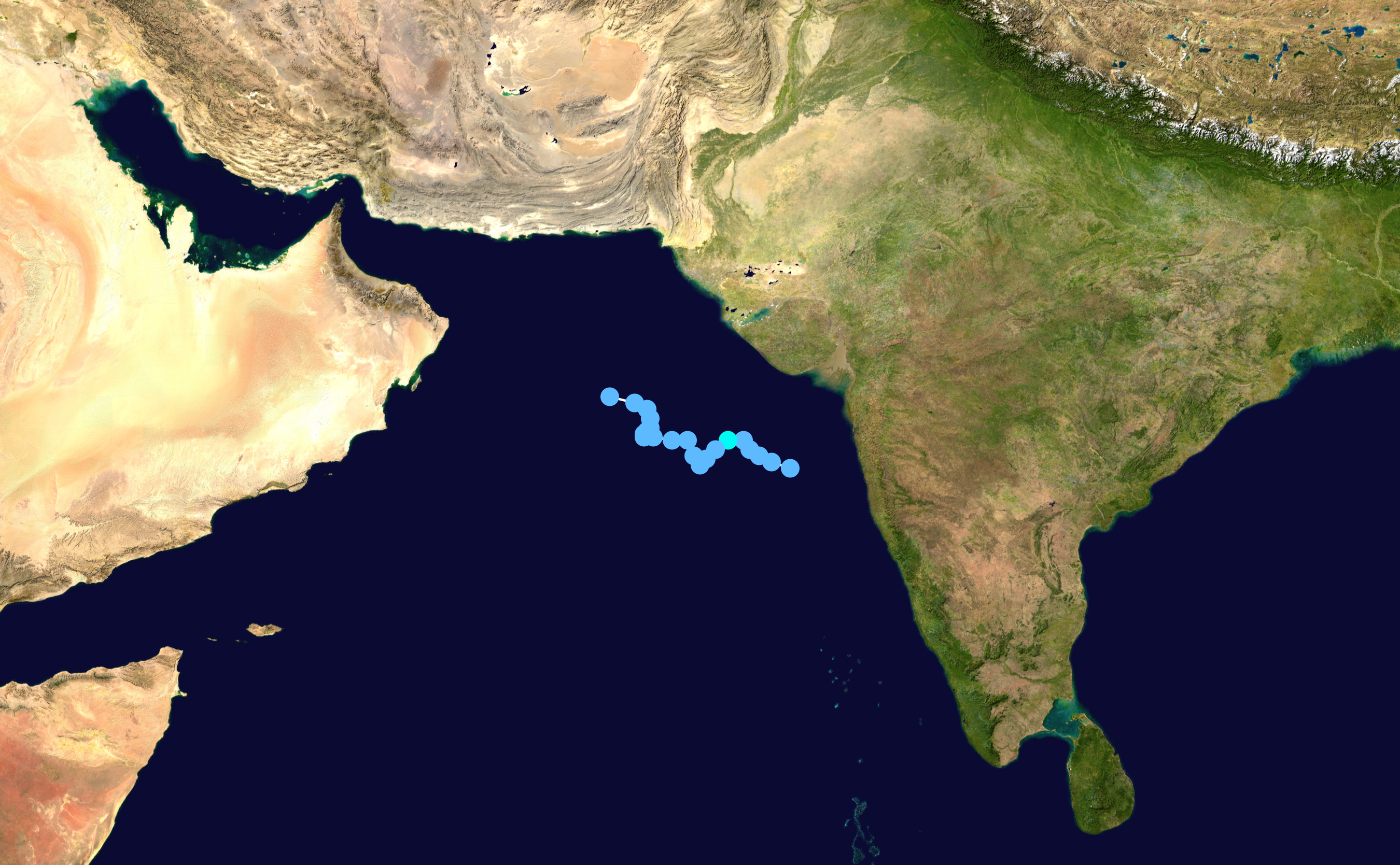
- Duration: October 7 – October 13
- Peak intensity: 65 km/h (40 mph) (3-min); 998 hPa (mbar)

Similar to the previous storm, an area of convection formed in the Arabian Sea about 185 km (115 mi) west-southwest of Mumbai on October 7. It was associated with a circulation that moved westward from the Indian Coast, which formed as a well-defined low-pressure area over western India. The convection organized and increased, aided by low wind shear and good outflow. Late on October 8, the IMD classified the system as a depression, and early the next day upgraded it to a deep depression. A low-level circulation formed beneath a well-defined mid-level storm, with intense convection and strong winds north of the center. At 06:00 UTC on October 9, the JTWC began classifying the system as Tropical Cyclone 03A.

With increasing banding features, the storm strengthened while moving west-northwestward, steered by a ridge to the north. At 09:00 UTC that day, the IMD upgraded the system to a cyclonic storm, estimating peak winds of 65 km/h (40 mph). Soon thereafter, the storm began weakening due to increased dry air and the upper-level environment becoming unfavorable. The thunderstorms diminished and disappeared over the circulation by October 10. That day, the JTWC discontinued advisories, and the IMD downgraded it to a remnant low-pressure area south of Pakistan. The storm brushed the Indian coast with rainfall, reaching 105 mm (4.1 in) in Gujarat state, although there was no major damage.

=== Cyclonic Storm BOB 02 ===
- Cyclonic storm (IMD)
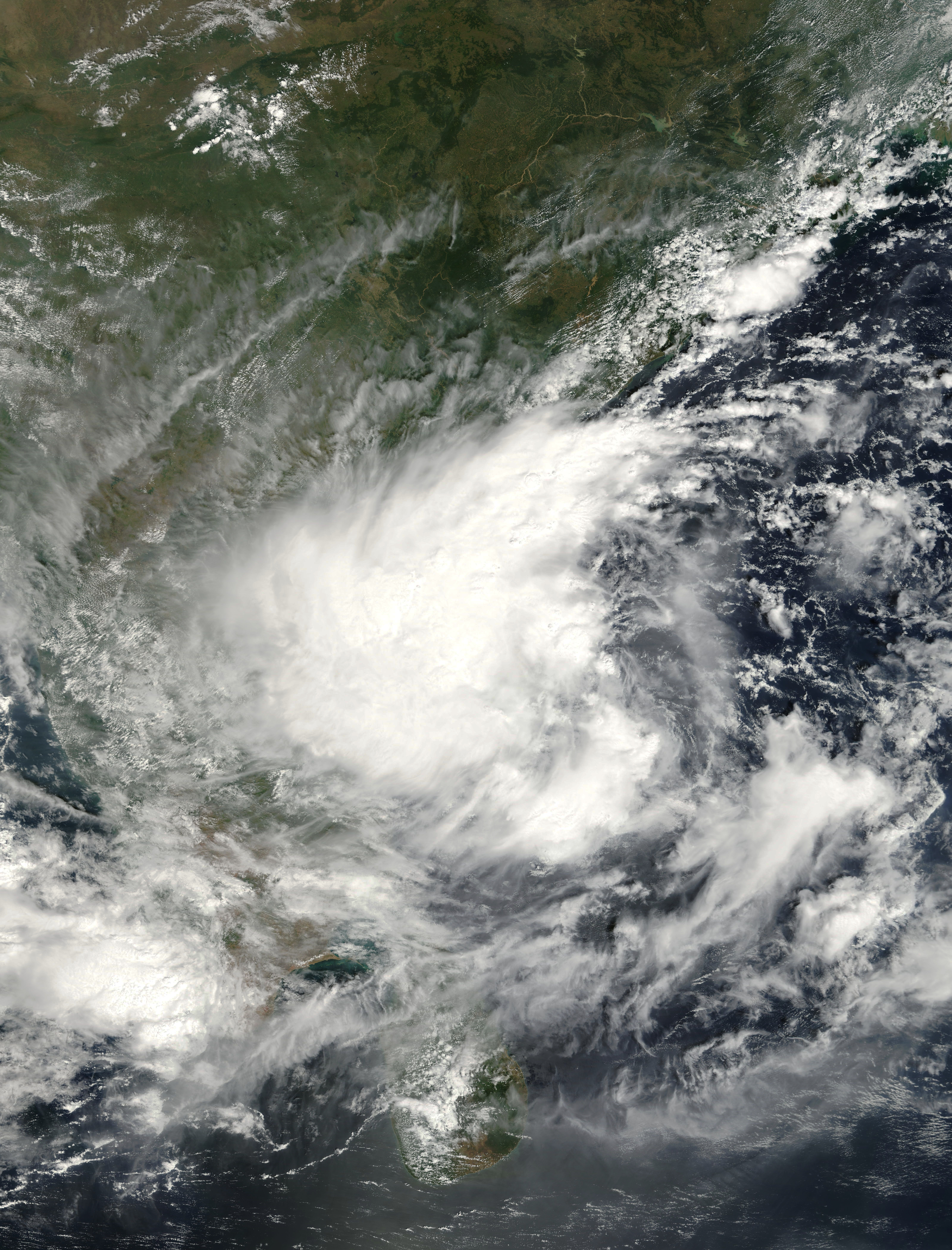
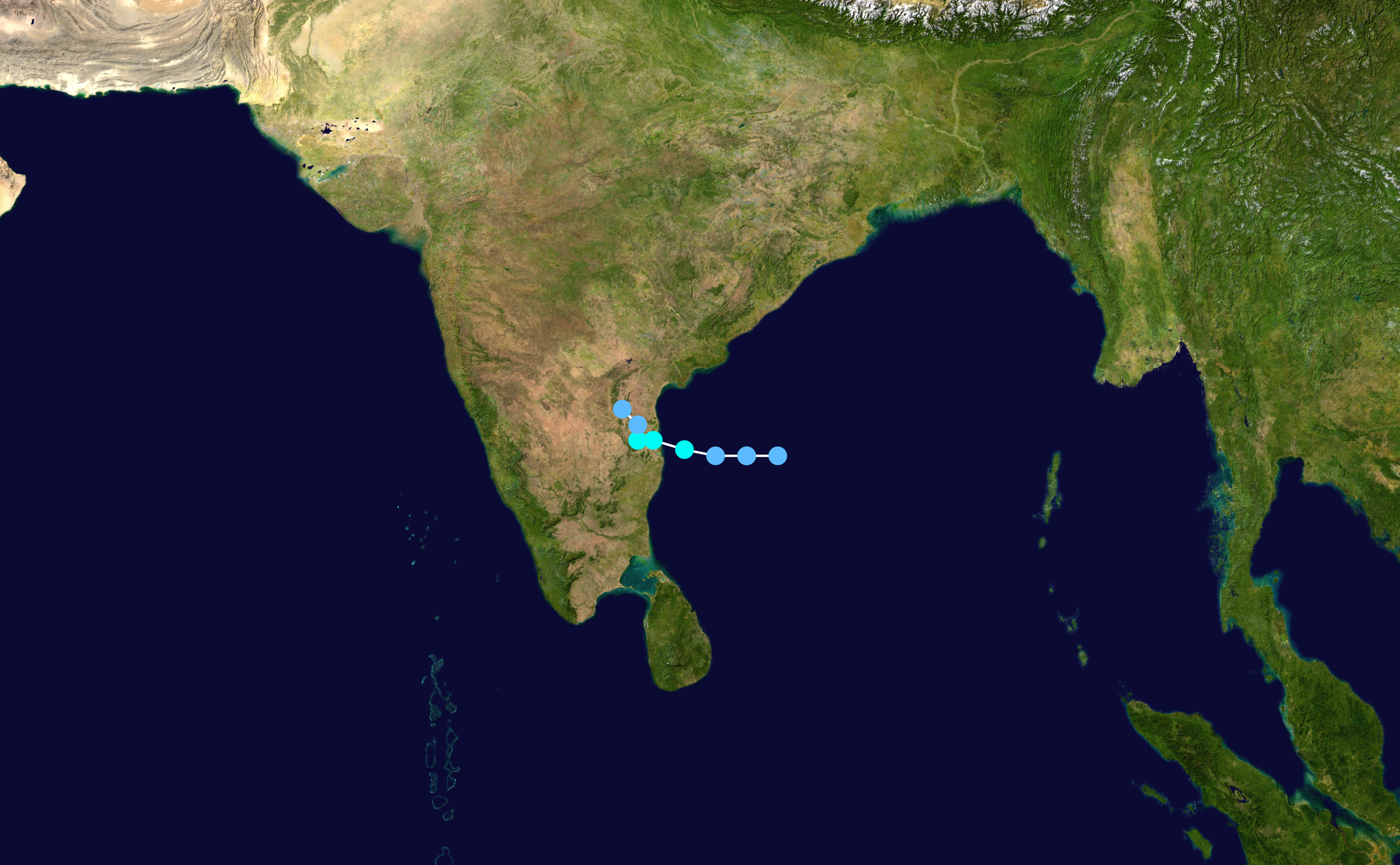
- Duration: October 14 – October 17
- Peak intensity: 65 km/h (40 mph) (3-min); 998 hPa (mbar)

Early on October 14, a low-pressure area formed off the eastern coast of India. While moving generally westward, the system quickly organized into a depression that day. On October 15, the IMD estimated peak winds of 65 km/h (40 mph), based on satellite imagery appearance warranting a Dvorak rating of 2.5; this made it a cyclonic storm. However, the circulation remained removed from the deep convection. Early on October 16, the storm made landfall near Nellore, Andhra Pradesh. It quickly weakened over land, degenerating into a remnant low-pressure area over Rayalaseema on October 17.

While moving ashore, the storm dropped heavy rainfall in Andhra Pradesh and extending into Tamil Nadu, causing flooding in some areas for the first time in 40 years. In a 24‑hour period, Sullurpeta recorded 261 mm (10.3 in) of precipitation, and 13 stations recorded daily totals of over 100 mm (4 in); the highest two-day rainfall total was 676.5 mm (26.63 in), and some areas received 300% of the average October rainfall within 36 hours. Damage was heaviest in Andhra Pradesh, particularly in Nellore, Chittoor, and Kadapa, although floods also extended into Bihar. Several regional roads and rail lines were damaged, including portions of National Highway 5, which stranded hundreds of trucks; the routes were reopened within two weeks. The rains breached 1,635 water tanks, while 125,000 ha (310,000 acres) of crop fields, mostly rice and groundnuts, were impaired. About 1,000 head of cattle were killed as well. In Cuddapah, excess water was released from irrigation dams along the Buggavanka River; water levels rose 1.5 m (4.9 ft) in the middle of the night, catching residents off guard, and damaging 18,244 houses. The dam was also breached in Nellore, and many towns in the region were inundated or isolated for two days. Across the state, the storm damaged 55,747 houses, accounting for RS5 billion (Indian rupees, US$104 million) in losses. There were 153 deaths related to the floods and the storm, mostly in Cuddapah.

Following the storm, the Indian Red Cross Society used funds related to previous floods and an earthquake to help 2,000 families. After the floods, the Indian government provided food and housing to 61,681 residents in 130 shelters, and distributed 20 kg of rice to each household. The army flew helicopters to drop off food, candles, and kerosene to stranded families in Cuddapah. Stagnant waters were disinfected after the floods, and deceased cattle were burned to reduce infection.

=== Other systems ===
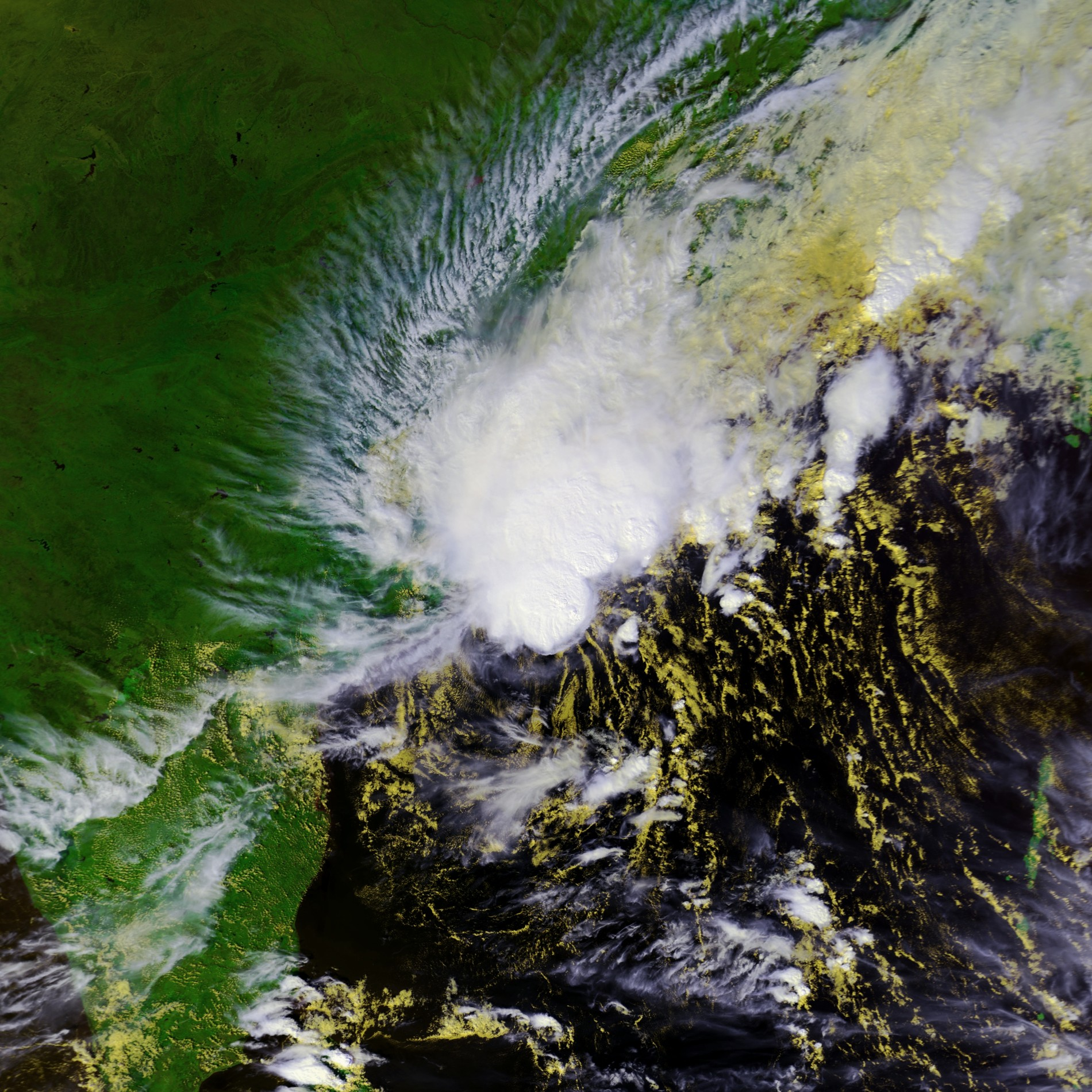
Satellite image of the November depression east of India

For several days in June, the JTWC monitored a disturbance in the northern Bay of Bengal for potential development, associated with the southwest monsoon. On June 9, a low-pressure area formed, and it became well-defined by June 11. By that time, there was convection located west of an exposed circulation. Early on the following day, the IMD classified it as a depression, estimating peak winds of 45 km/h (30 mph). Strong wind shear prevented much development. Shortly after forming, the system moved northwestward and made landfall near Paradip, Odisha. It quickly weakened below depression intensity on June 13 while progressing inland, degenerating into a remnant low near Madhya Pradesh on June 15. The system dropped heavy rainfall along its path, with a daily peak of 350 mm (14 in) in Vidarbha.

On November 7, a cycling area of convection was persistent off the east coast of India, associated with a broad circulation embedded within a trough. The thunderstorms expanded and gradually organized, aided by good outflow and low wind shear. On November 11, the IMD upgraded the system to a depression off the coast of Tamil Nadu and Andhra Pradesh. On the same day, the JTWC began classifying the depression as Tropical Cyclone 04B. Located within a weakness of the ridge, the depression moved slowly to the north and northeast, and was initially expected to move ashore. However, increasing shear removed the convection from the center, and the storm remained offshore while weakening. On November 12, the IMD downgraded the system back to a low-pressure area. The storm brought rainfall to coastal portions of eastern India, peaking at 150 mm (5.9 in) in Paradip.

The near-equator Tropical Storm Vamei crossed Sumatra from the South China Sea at the end of December. According to the Japan Meteorological Agency – the official agency covering the western Pacific Ocean – the storm weakened into a remnant low on December 28, along the east coast of Sumatra. On the next day, the remnants entered the Bay of Bengal, and thunderstorms soon reformed over the circulation due to weak to moderate wind shear. After the remnants of Vamei regenerated, the JTWC classified it as Tropical Cyclone 05B on December 30, although the agency later treated it as a continuation of the original storm. Moving west-northwest, the storm re-intensified to a secondary peak of 65 km/h (40 mph). However, an increase in wind shear left the circulation center exposed. Vamei quickly weakened, dissipating early on January 1, 2002. The IMD never tracked the storm.

== Season effects ==
This is a table of all storms in the 2001 North Indian Ocean cyclone season. It mentions all of the season's storms and their names, duration, peak intensities (according to the IMD storm scale), damage, and death totals. Damage and death totals include the damage and deaths caused when that storm was a precursor wave or extratropical low, and all of the damage figures are in 2001 USD.

Name	Dates	Peak intensity			Areas affected	Damage (USD)	Deaths	Refs
Name	Dates	Category	Wind speed	Pressure	Areas affected	Damage (USD)	Deaths	Refs
ARB 01	May 21–28	Extremely Severe Cyclonic Storm	215 km/h (135 mph)	932 hPa (27.52 inHg)	Western India	Minimal	900	
BOB 01	June 12–13	Depression	45 km/h (30 mph)	990 hPa (29.23 inHg)	East India	Minimal		
ARB 02	September 25–28	Cyclonic Storm	65 km/h (40 mph)	1,000 hPa (29.53 inHg)	None	None	None	
ARB 03	October 7–13	Cyclonic Storm	65 km/h (40 mph)	998 hPa (29.47 inHg)	Western India	None	None	
BOB 02	October 14–17	Cyclonic Storm	65 km/h (40 mph)	998 hPa (29.47 inHg)	Southeast India	None	None	
BOB 03	November 11–12	Depression	45 km/h (30 mph)	1,004 hPa (29.65 inHg)	India	Minimal		
Season aggregates
6 systems	May 21 –January 1		215 km/h (135 mph)	932 hPa (27.52 inHg)				

== See also ==
- List of tropical cyclone records
- 2001 Atlantic hurricane season
- 2001 Pacific hurricane season
- 2001 Pacific typhoon season
- South-West Indian Ocean cyclone seasons: 2000–01, 2001–02
- Australian region cyclone seasons: 2000–01, 2001–02
- South Pacific cyclone seasons: 2000–01, 2001–02
