= Hadmatiya =

- Village
- Location in Gujarat, India
- Coordinates: 22.20°N 70.12°E
- Country: India
- State: Gujarat
- District: Jamnagar

Population (2010)
  - Total: 12,000

Languages
  - Official: Gujarati, Hindi
- Time zone: UTC+5:30 (IST)
- PIN: 361 xxx
- Telephone code: 288
- Vehicle registration: GJ-03

Hadmatiya is a village in the Indian state of Gujarat, located 21 kilometres (13 mi) from the city of Jamnagar.

== Demographics ==
As of 2010, Hadmatiya had a population of 12,000, of whom 60% were male and 40% female. Male literacy is 85%, and female literacy 75% giving an average literacy rate of 80%. Five% of the population is under six years of age while 70% of the people live in city areas such as Jamnagar, Rajkot, Surat and Mumbai amongst others leaving 30% resident in Hadmatiya.

== Culture ==
All residents of Hadmatiya are Gujarati and speak Gujarati language. Kathiawadi, a variety of Gujarati, is widely used for day to day communication. Major communities include Patels, Rajputs (Darbars), Sathwara (Dalvadi), Ahirs (Yadav), Bhanushalis, Mers, Jains, Lohanasdalit, etc.

In Hadmatiya, 75% of people are Rajputs (Darbars) while 5% belong to other castes.

== Religion ==
Hadmatiya contains several ancient and archeologically important temples, such as Ram Choro in the center of the town along with the Mahadev (Shiv) Temple, Ghodakhara Pir, Bhathiji Maharaj Temple (Vachhada dada), as well as many more small temples.

In Hadmatiya, 60% of the people believe in Shuddhadvaita (Vishnu), 30% are followers of Swaminarayan Sampraday, while 10% believe in all Hindu religions.

== Economy ==
Hadmatiya's main activity is agriculture with 98% of people owning their own land. Most of them are engaged in farming, producing main crops such as ground nuts, bajra, cotton, and sesame seeds. There is also a brass industry in Jamnagar employing 20% of the local people as well as diamond business in Surat that employs 10%. Other business such as clothing showrooms, stationery, and retail shops account for a further 35%. The service sector employs 5% of Hadmatiya's people who are employed as managers, consultants and accountants amongst other professions. The remaining 30% of the population are involved in agriculture.
