= Pipavav =

Pipavav પીપાવાવ
- Village
- Location in Gujarat, India Pipavav (India)
- Coordinates: 21°00′43″N 71°32′3″E
- Country: India
- State: Gujarat
- District: Amreli

Languages
  - Official: Gujarati
- Time zone: UTC+5:30 (IST)
- Vehicle registration: GJ
- Nearest city: Rajula city
- Website: gujaratindia.gov.in

Pipavav is a village located near the West coast of Gujarat, India. By road it is 2 hours (85 km) from Amreli, 30 minutes (16 km) from Rajula, 2.5 hours (130 km) from Bhavnagar on the East and 1.5 hrs (78 km) from Diu on the West. The nearest town is Rajula.

The village gave its name to the nearby Port Pipavav. It had a population of 1,858 of which 933 were males while 925 females, as per the 2011 Census.

== History ==
The name 'Pipavav' has two parts; the name 'Pipa' originates from the name of Saint Pipaji, who was a king from Rajasthan who left his kingdom in search of the eternity along with his queen Sitadevi. 'Vav' in Gujarati refers to a well. Pipavav village still has a well that was dug by Saint Pipaji. There is temple of Radha and Krishna in the village and there is a saying that its idols were obtained during the digging of the well.

Villagers mentions the importance of the place during the time of the Mahabharata, wherein Krishna (with Rukmini) stopped in the village on their way to Dwarka.

Preacher Morari Bapu held a Ram Katha at Pipavav to collect funds for the development of the Pipavav temple.
