= Kovaya =

Princely state in the Kathiawar region

Kowaya (also spelled Kovaya) was historically a Ahir princely state in the Kathiawar region.

== History ==
Kowaya was originally ruled by Ahir chieftains. After India's independence in 1947, Junagadh acceded to the Indian Union, and Kowaya became part of the state of Gujarat.

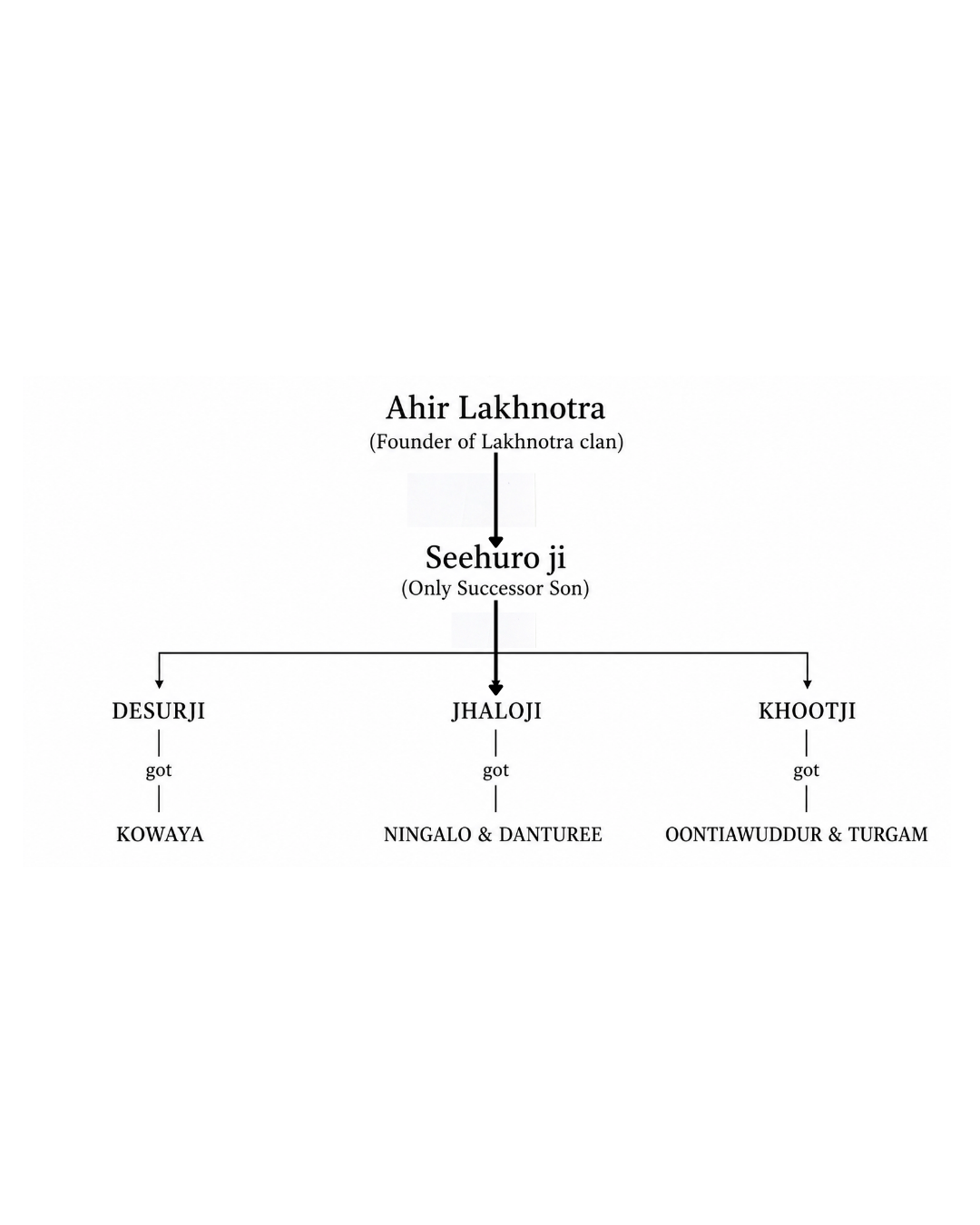
