= Gujarat Maritime Board =

Government agency of Gujarat, India

Gujarat Maritime Board (GMB) is an agency of the Government of Gujarat, a state of India. It was founded in 1982 to manage and operate the minor ports of Gujarat.

== History ==
The GMB was founded in 1982 under the Gujarat Maritime Board Act, 1981. It controls, manage and operates total 44 minor ports of Gujarat including some with private companies.

From 3% of the total national port traffic handled by minor ports of Gujarat in 1982-83, they grown to handle 31% of total national port traffic in 2016-17. They also handles 71.3% of all minor port traffic of India. In 2018-19, minor ports of Gujarat handled total 542 MMT of cargo.

== Ports ==
GMB operates 44 minor ports of Gujarat and they are operated under 10 port offices listed below:

- New Bedi
- Sikka
- Salaya
- Jodia
- Sachana
- Jafrabad Port
- Navlakhi Port
- Vadinar Port
- Veraval Port
- Bhavnagar Port
- Magdalla Port
- Okha Port
- Dahej Port
- Mandvi Port
- Porbandar Port

Greenfield ports operated by private companies

- Mundra Port
- Dahej Port
- Hazira Port
- Pipavav Port
- Tuna Port

Other ports

- Jakhau
- Victor Port

== See also ==
- Gujarat Maritime University - operated by GMB Education Trust
- GMB Polytechnic, Rajula - operated by GMB Education Trust
- DG Sea Connect - ferry service
