= List of Gujarat tropical cyclones =

Gujarat, located on the western coast of India, is impacted by the tropical cyclones originating mostly in the Arabian Sea. The Arabian Sea, historically considered less susceptible to intense cyclonic activity compared to the Bay of Bengal, has exhibited an unusual and increasingly severe pattern of cyclonic storms, with high-intensity tropical cyclones forming at short intervals. This shift, marked by a growing formation and increased severity of cyclones, is largely attributed to climate change, which is projected to escalate both the intensity and frequency of these storms in the region. Scientific studies corroborate this trend, indicating a significant rise in the Sea Surface Temperature (SST) of the Arabian Sea and a threefold increase in the frequency of severe cyclones reaching extreme intensities. There is a positive trend in both the frequency and intensity of cyclonic activity between 2001 and 2019.

Gujarat demonstrates significant vulnerability to cyclonic activity, with 12 of its 16 coastal districts situated within 100 km of the coastline classified as "Highly Prone" (P2) to cyclone hazards by the India Meteorological Department (IMD) in 2015.

== Climatology ==
The Arabian Sea, historically considered less prone to intense cyclonic activity compared to the Bay of Bengal, has exhibited an unusual and increasingly severe pattern of cyclonic storms. This shift is evidenced by the observation of high-intensity tropical cyclones forming in short intervals, with five extremely severe cyclones originating in the Sea between 1998 and 2013. This abnormal activity, which has led to a growing formation and increased severity of cyclones, is largely attributed to the climate change, which is projected to aggravate both the intensity and frequency of cyclonic storms in the region.

Scientific studies corroborate this trend, indicating a significant rise in the Sea Surface Temperature (SST) of the Arabian Sea. The UN Intergovernmental Panel on Climate Change (IPCC) special report in 2019 noted that the Arabian Sea is rapidly responding to climate change signals, registering a threefold increase in the frequency of severe cyclones and reaching extreme intensities. The National Institute of Oceanography study identified a warming of the Arabian Sea from 10 milli-degree per year between 1960 and 1995 to 14 milli-degree per year post-1995, resulting from a decreased capacity to dissipate accumulated heat. Koll et al. (2018) documented a significant increase in cyclones from one (1979–1996) to six (1997–2014), linking this to La Niña-like conditions that create favorable conditions for cyclogenesis. Murakami et al. (2017) suggested that anthropogenic warming is altering cyclone behavior over the Arabian Sea, with 64% of the cyclone risk attributed to climate change. Evan et al. (2011) indicated that weakened climatological vertical wind shear and increased anthropogenic aerosol emissions, which diminish monsoonal circulation winds, contribute to heightened cyclonic activity. Sun et al. (2019) further confirmed an accelerated warming of the Arabian Sea since the 1990s, particularly in spring, leading to increased cyclonic activity. Analysis of cyclonic activity in the Arabian Sea from 2001 to 2019 reveals a positive trend in both frequency and weighted intensity, suggesting a projected increase in the number and destructive potential of cyclones impacting the region.

== Cyclone vulnerability ==
Wind Zone Map of India. Gujarat, on the west, has the districts around Gulf of Kutch in "Very High Damage Risk Zone" while the districts around Gulf of Khambhat in a "High Damage Risk Zone".

Gujarat exhibits a significant vulnerability to cyclonic activity, a proneness confirmed by various scientific analyses. A 2015 study of the India Meteorological Department (IMD) classified 12 of 16 coastal districts of Gujarat, situated within 100 km of the coastline, as "Highly Prone" (P2) to cyclone hazards, with the remaining districts falling into "Moderately Prone" (P3) and "Low Prone" (P4) categories. Newer districts such as Morbi and Gir Somnath are also identified as "Highly Prone" (P2), while Devbhumi Dwarka falls between P2 and P3. Specifically, the coastal regions extending from Bhavnagar to Navsari are deemed "Highly Prone" to cyclone risks.

According to the Gujarat Wind Hazard Map published by the Building Materials and Technology Promotion Council (BMTPC) in 2015, Bhavnagar and Ahmedabad districts within this stretch are designated as "Very High Damage Risk Zone" with basic wind speeds of 180 kmph, while the other districts under consideration are in a "High Damage Risk Zone" with basic wind speeds of 169 kmph. The 2019 Cyclone Occurrence Map by BMTPC indicates that most coastal regions from Bhavnagar to Navsari typically experience maximum sustained winds of 119–167 kmph, although Navsari district records lower sustained winds of 63–87 kmph.

Furthermore, the 2005 Hazard Risk Vulnerability Atlas of Gujarat State, prepared by the Gujarat State Disaster Management Authority (GSDMA), highlights that parts of the Saurashtra coast, including Porbandar, Jamnagar, and Junagadh districts, are exposed to high-intensity cyclonic and storm impacts, with potential maximum wind speeds exceeding 198 kmph. Overall, the Arabian Sea, which impacts Gujarat, has shown a positive trend in both the frequency and intensity of cyclonic activity between 2001 and 2019, suggesting a projected increase in the number and destructive potential of cyclones affecting the region.

== List of tropical cyclones ==
=== 1880s ===
- November 4 – 10, 1888 – A tropical cyclone had formed in the Arabian Sea and later moved northeastwards before making landfall on the Kathiawar coast. More than 740 people went missing when a ship SS Vaitarna disappeared in the sea during the storm.

=== 1960s ===
- July 2 – 5, 1960 – A depression remained stationary off the Saurashtra coast for days. Heavy rains amounting to more than 300 mm (12 in) fell across much of the Saurashtra. These rains triggered severe flooding that killed at least 35 people and left 6,000 others homeless. At least 500 homes were destroyed in the region.
- June 21 – 26, 1961 – A severe cyclonic storm developed in the Arabian Sea. The system struck Gujarat before dissipating.
- June 27 – 28, 1961 – A land depression remained around the Gujarat for several days, resulting in prolonged rains that amounted to 680 mm (27 in) in Junagadh.
- July 8 – 15, 1962 – A depression affected Gujarat.
- September 8 – 14, 1962 – A depression affected Gujarat.
- October 13 – 17, 1963 – Thunderstorms were noted in Gujarat due to this off coast cyclonic storm.
- June 9 – 3, 1964 – A very severe cyclonic storm formed off coast of Karnataka in Arabian Sea recurved northeastwards and crossed the coast of Gujarat near Naliya. 27 deaths were reported due to the cyclone in India. Prolonged rains associated with the system triggered severe flooding in Pakistan that killed 450 people. Approximately 400,000 were affected by the floods and damage amounted to $4.1 million.
- August 3 – 8, 1968 – A deep depression caused heavy to very heavy rainfall in Saurashtra and Kutch. Thus severe flooding occurred in parts of Gujarat. South Gujarat also got affected because of the overflowing of the Narmada and Tapti rivers. Rail communications between Gujarat and Bombay State were cut off, only being restored after a month.
- June 5 – 6, 1969 – A depression made land near Diu. Under the influence of the system, the monsoon advanced on the Arabian Sea, particularly on Maharashtra and south Gujarat coasts.

=== 1970s ===
- September 2 – 13, 1970 – A low-pressure area that was centred over West Bengal. It intensified as it moved to the west, becoming a deep depression which continued to move west across India, before weakening into a depression on near Ahmedabad, Gujarat. The depression then turned northward and entered southwest Rajasthan. On September 8, the system turned to the southwest and emerged into the Arabian Sea and turned into cyclonic storm. This system brought widespread rains to a wide swathe of India during its existence. Both the Narmada and Tapti Rivers inundated parts of Madhya Pradesh and Gujarat. The floods in Gujarat took many lives and caused severe damage to crops and other properties. Between 300 and 400 people were washed away in two villages in Bharuch district. 260 mm (10 in) of rain fell on Surat on July 7 and a further 80 mm (3.1 in) on Kutch District as the cyclone moved out to sea.
- October 17 – 24, 1975 – A very severe cyclonic storm formed in the Arabian Sea, off the coast of Maharashtra and moved towards Gujarat coast. It made landfall in Porbandar. It killed 85 people and caused estimated damages worth ₹75 crore (equivalent to ₹21 billion or US$220 million in 2023).
- May 31 – June 6, 1976 – An extremely severe cyclonic storm formed on 31 May and gradually intensified to a severe cyclone. On 3 June, the storm made landfall over Saurashtra coast and rapidly weakened thereafter. 70 people and 4500 cattle were killed due to the storm with 25,000 houses damaged. Damages were estimated to be ₹3 crore (equivalent to ₹91 crore or US$9.5 million in 2023).

=== 1980s ===
- November 4 – 9, 1982 – An extremely severe cyclonic storm formed in the Arabian Sea. It tracked northeastward, strengthening into a tropical storm on the 6 November and a cyclone on 7 November. The system peaked at 100 mph winds before hitting Veraval next day. The cyclone rapidly dissipated, after resulting in 511 casualties and heavy flooding. Damages were estimated to be ₹128 crore (equivalent to ₹24 billion or US$250 million in 2023).

=== 1990s ===
- June 4 – 10, 1998 – An extremely severe cyclonic storm formed over the Laccadive Islands and moved across the Arabian Sea and made landfall near Porbandar and then moved towards Kandla Port. It killed at least 1,173 people, mostly in Gujarat. It was one of the deadliest cyclones which hit the state.
- May 16 – 22 – An extremely severe cyclonic storm formed in the Arabian Sea and landfall in Kutch and then moved to Pakistan. It proved to be very deadly with 6,400 people reported to be dead. Damages totaled to $6 million (1999 USD).

=== 2000s ===
- May 21 – 29, 2001 – An extremely severe cyclonic storm. Heavily affected Kandla, Kosamba, Jamnagar and Valsad. Between 120 and 900 fishermen were listed as missing after contact was lost with their vessels during the storm.
- October 7 – 13, 2001 – A cyclonic storm formed and weaken in the Arabian Sea but brought heavy rains in South Gujarat.
- September 30 – October 10, 2004 – A severe cyclonic storm Onil attained its peak intensity on October 2. However, dry air quickly entered the system, causing it to rapidly weaken to a depression just off the coast of Gujarat, India. Over the following several days, the system took a slow, erratic track towards the south-southeast. After turning northeastward, the system made landfall near Porbandar on October 10 and dissipated shortly thereafter.
- June 21 – 22, 2005 – A depression impacted western Gujarat.
- September 14 – 16, 2005 – A depression impacted western Gujarat and caused 13 deaths.
- September 21 – 24, 2006 – A severe cyclonic storm Mudka formed in sea but did not make landfall and dissipated. Impacted Saurashtra region with rains.

=== 2010s ===
- May 31 – June 7, 2010 – A very severe cyclonic storm Phet impacted Gujarat and killed 5 people.
- June 11 – 12, 2011 - A depression made a landfall on Saurashtra coast.
- October 25 – 31, 2014 - An extremely severe cyclonic storm Nilofar formed and dissipated in the Arabian Sea but brought rains in Gujarat.
- June 22 – 24, 2015 - A deep depression caused flood in Amreli, Gir Somnath and Rajkot districts of Gujarat. It caused 81 deaths and heavy damages.
- November 29 –December 6, 2017 - A very severe cyclonic storm Ockhi had minor impact on Surat district.
- June 10 – 17, 2019 – A very severe cyclonic storm Vayu heavily impacted Gujarat during its two approaches to land. 8 were killed and thousands were evacuated.
- September 22 – 25, 2019 - A very severe cyclonic storm Hikaa limited effects on southern coast of Gujarat.
- September 29 – October 1, 2019 - A land depression caused heavy rains in parts of Gujarat.
- October 30 – November 7, 2019 - An extremely severe cyclonic storm Maha had made landfall near Gujarat as a tropical depression. It had impacted Diu.

=== 2020s ===
- May 14 – 19, 2021 – An extremely severe cyclonic storm Tauktae caused 174 deaths and estimated damages worth $1.57 billion.
- September 12 – 15, 2021 – A deep depression result in heavy rainfall in Gujarat.
- September 30 – October 4, 2021 – A severe cyclonic storm Shaheen caused heavy rains in Gujarat.
- July 16 – 18, 2022 – A depression off the Saurashtra coast had no impact on Gujarat.
- August 12 – 13, 2022 – A depression off the Saurashtra coast had no impact on Gujarat.
- June 6–19, 2023 – An extremely severe cyclonic storm Biparjoy made landfall in Naliya. More than 1,50,000 people were evacuated. At least 23 people were injured as well as 4,600 villages were affected by power outages. Total 12 people were confirmed to have been killed.
- August 25 – September 2, 2024 – Cyclone Asna formed as deep depression over land, intensified in the cyclone and moved into Arabian Sea. The heavy rains caused widespread flooding across Gujarat and Sindh, leading to the deaths of 49 people in Gujarat and 24 in Pakistan.
- October 25 – 31, 2025 – A depression over the Arabian Sea brought heavy rainfall across Gujarat causing widespread crop loss.
