= 1975 Porbandar cyclone =

North Indian Ocean cyclone in 1975

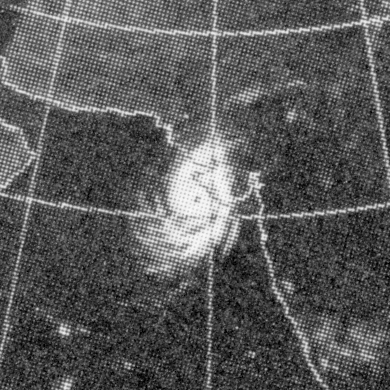
- Cyclone on 21 October

Meteorological history
- Formed: 17 October 1975
- Dissipated: 24 October 1975

Very severe cyclonic storm
- 3-minute sustained (IMD)
- Highest winds: 150 km/h (90 mph)
- Lowest pressure: 966 hPa (mbar); 28.53 inHg

Category 2-equivalent tropical cyclone
- 1-minute sustained (SSHWS/JTWC)
- Highest winds: 155 km/h (100 mph)

Overall effects
- Fatalities: 85
- Damage: ₹75 crore (equivalent to ₹21 billion or US$250 million in 2023)
- Areas affected: Gujarat, India
- IBTrACS
- Part of the 1975 North Indian Ocean cyclone season

The 1975 Porbandar cyclone, also designated Cyclone Sixteen (16A) by Joint Typhoon Warning Center, was a tropical cyclone that affected Gujarat state of India and southern Pakistan from 17 to 24 October 1975. It killed 85 people and caused damages of estimated ₹75 crore (equivalent to ₹21 billion or US$250 million in 2023).

== Meteorological history ==
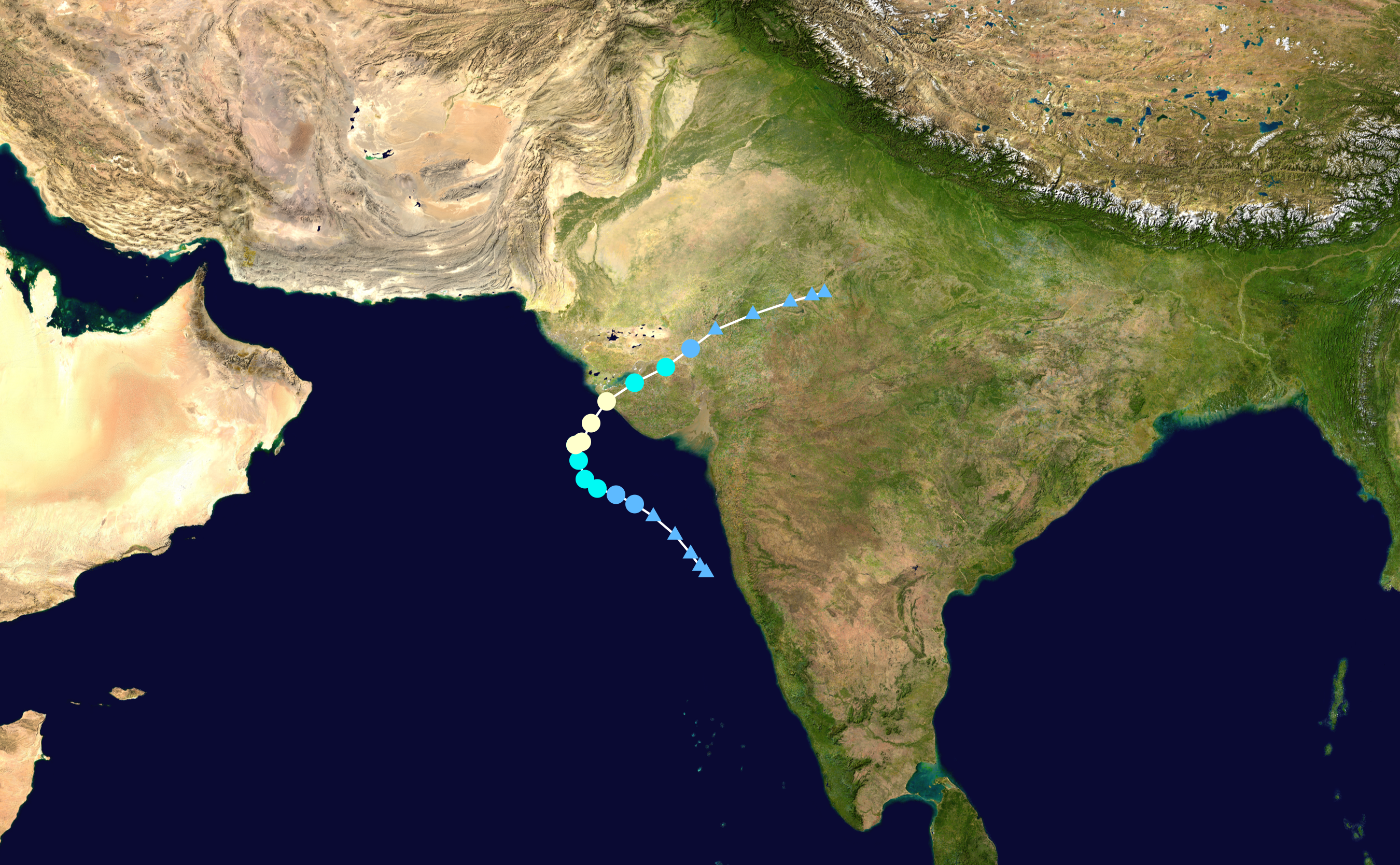
Map plotting the storm's track and intensity, according to the Saffir–Simpson scale Map key Saffir–Simpson scale Tropical depression (≤38 mph, ≤62 km/h) Tropical storm (39–73 mph, 63–118 km/h) Category 1 (74–95 mph, 119–153 km/h) Category 2 (96–110 mph, 154–177 km/h) Category 3 (111–129 mph, 178–208 km/h) Category 4 (130–156 mph, 209–251 km/h) Category 5 (≥157 mph, ≥252 km/h) Unknown Storm type Tropical cyclone Subtropical cyclone Extratropical cyclone, remnant low, tropical disturbance, or monsoon depression

On 17 October 1975, the remnant of an earlier depression in the west central Bay of Bengal were moving towards India. Next day, the disturbance crossed the Andhra Pradesh coast and weakened into a low-pressure area. However, another low-pressure area formed in the east central Arabian Sea. The system was classified as T1 in the Dvorak technique, suggesting it was a tropical storm. On 19 October, these two low-pressure circulations merged to form a depression centered near Maharashtra coast. The system intensity was classified as T2. The depression continued to intensify and moved west-northwestwards moving into the Arabian Sea. On the morning of the 20 October, the system intensified into a deep depression and was centered near 18.5°N, 70°E in Arabian Sea. The system intensity was classified as T3.5. By the noon, the deep depression had intensified into a cyclonic storm. It continued to move towards northwest. The next day it intensified in the severe cyclonic storm and moved towards north-northeast. On 22 October morning, it slightly weaken before making a landfall on coast about 10-15 km north of Porbandar. It moved northeast and weaken into cyclonic storm by 23 October, centred near Radhanpur. By the next day noon, it had weaken into depression on 24 October near Kota in Rajasthan and then rapidly became a well-marked low-pressure area and moved northeastward before dissipating on 24 October evening near Uttar Pradesh.

It was the first time since 1877 that a severe cyclonic storm landed in Gujarat in October month and second since a cyclonic storm in October 1917.

== Effects ==
The height of swells were noted 4 m at Porbandar, 5 m at Dwarka and 6 m at Okha.

The cyclone caused severe damage to livelihoods, killing 85 people. Total damages were estimated to be ₹75 crore (equivalent to ₹21 billion or US$250 million in 2023) which included buildings, crops, grain storages and others. It caused severe damage in Junagadh, Rajkot and Jamnagar districts. Large number of houses were destroyed and the rail traffic was disturbed for about a week.

== See also ==
- List of Gujarat tropical cyclones
- 1888 Arabian Sea cyclone
- 1998 Gujarat cyclone
- Cyclone Tauktae
