= Cyclone Asna =

North Indian Ocean cyclone in 2024

Cyclonic Storm Asna
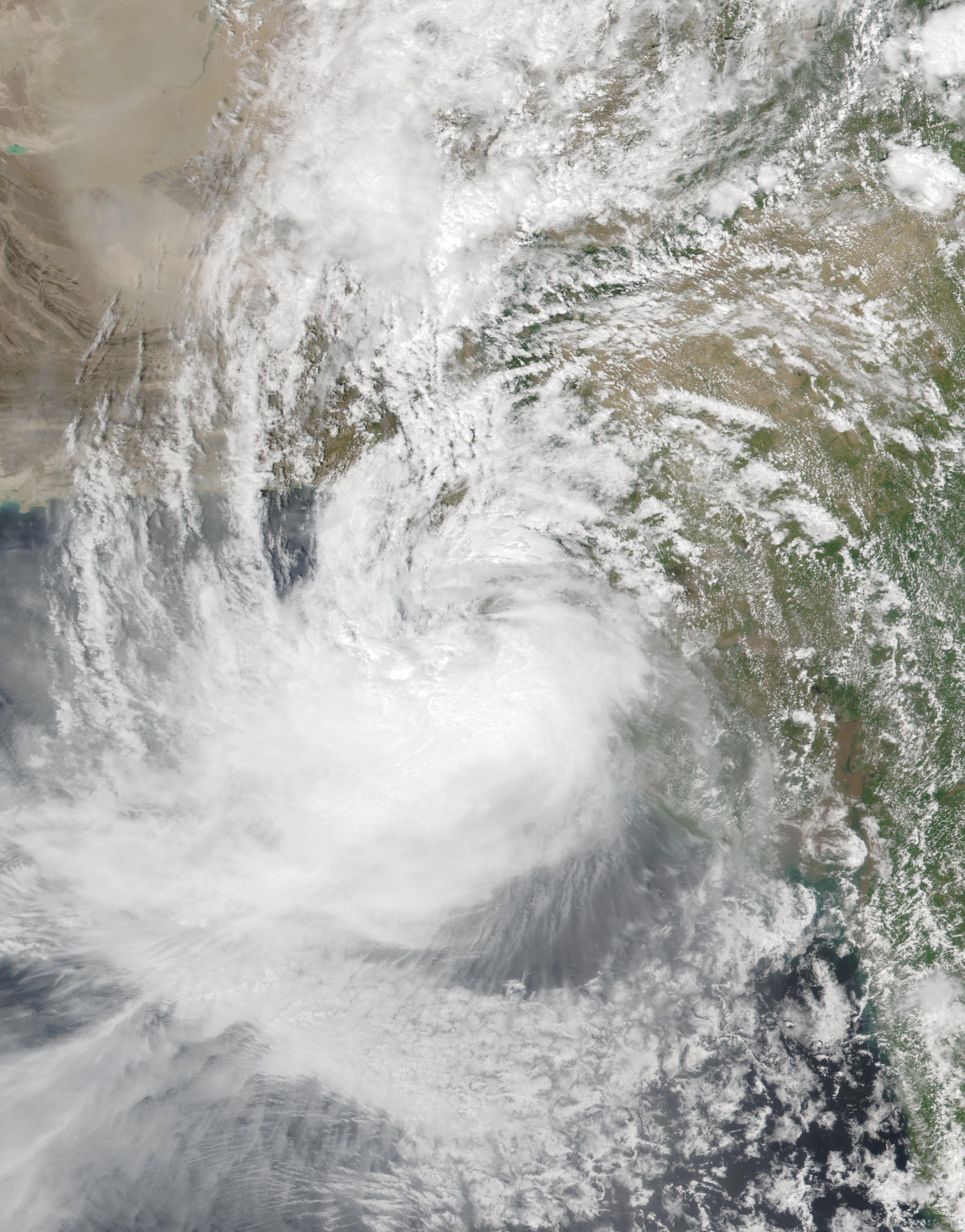
- Cyclone Asna moving offshore from India on 30 August

Meteorological history
- Formed: 25 August 2024
- Dissipated: 2 September 2024

Cyclonic storm
- 3-minute sustained (IMD)
- Highest winds: 75 km/h (45 mph)
- Lowest pressure: 990 hPa (mbar); 29.23 inHg

Tropical storm
- 1-minute sustained (SSHWS/JTWC)
- Highest winds: 75 km/h (45 mph)
- Lowest pressure: 987 hPa (mbar); 29.15 inHg

Overall effects
- Fatalities: 73
- Damage: $30 million (2024 USD)
- Areas affected: Gujarat, Rajasthan and Madhya Pradesh; India; Sindh and Balochistan; Pakistan
- Part of the 2024 North Indian Ocean cyclone season

Cyclonic Storm Asna (Note: The name Asna (Urdu: اسنا, [ɑːsnɑː]) was contributed by Pakistan and is a feminine given name meaning "praised" in Urdu.) was a tropical cyclone that affected the states of Gujarat, Rajasthan and Madhya Pradesh in India, as well as southern Pakistan from 25 August to 2 September 2024. It formed as deep depression over land, intensified in the cyclone and moved into Arabian Sea. The heavy rains from deep depression caused widespread flooding across Gujarat and Sindh, leading to the deaths of 49 people in India and 24 in Pakistan, while also inflicting significant damage to infrastructure, private property, and agricultural lands.

== Meteorological history ==
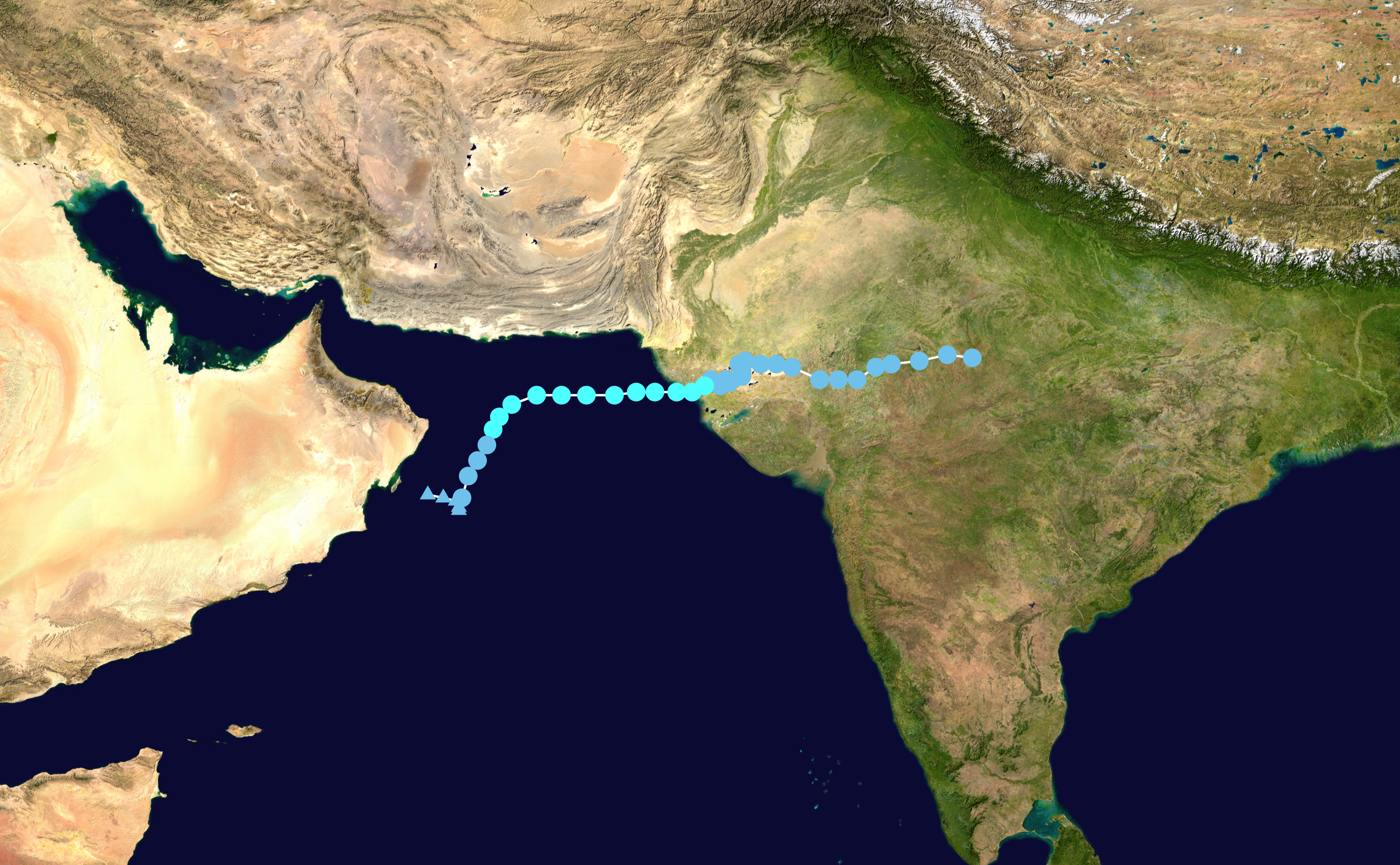
Map plotting the storm's track and intensity, according to the Saffir–Simpson scale Map key Saffir–Simpson scale Tropical depression (≤38 mph, ≤62 km/h) Tropical storm (39–73 mph, 63–118 km/h) Category 1 (74–95 mph, 119–153 km/h) Category 2 (96–110 mph, 154–177 km/h) Category 3 (111–129 mph, 178–208 km/h) Category 4 (130–156 mph, 209–251 km/h) Category 5 (≥157 mph, ≥252 km/h) Unknown Storm type Tropical cyclone Subtropical cyclone Extratropical cyclone, remnant low, tropical disturbance, or monsoon depression

Strong easterly winds over southern India, combined with a monsoonal event called the Boreal Summer Intraseasonal Oscillation (BSISO), have created the conditions for the formation of low-pressure system which later turned into the depression. The land depression likely intensified due to moisture received from the Arabian Sea and the soil soaked by previous rains.

A low-pressure system formed in the northwest Bay of Bengal near West Bengal and Bangladesh on 16 August. On 24 August, a well-marked low-pressure system formed over Madhya and Uttar Pradesh. Early the next day, on 25 August, the IMD noted that it had developed into a land depression over Rajasthan and Madhya Pradesh. Later that day, the depression intensified into a deep depression southeast of Udaipur in Rajasthan. On 27 August, the JTWC began tracking the deep depression, noting that it was in a marginal environment for development. Two days later, on 29 August when it reached Gujarat, they issued a TCFA on the developing depression, prior to designating it as Tropical Cyclone 02A early the next day. Later that same day, on 30 August, the IMD upgraded it into a cyclonic storm, naming it Asna. It then moved into the northeastern Arabian Sea, but subsequently shifted southwestward, away from the coasts of Sindh and Balochistan, weakening into a deep depression as it continued west-southwest towards Oman. On 1 September, Asna was stripped of any convection due to dry air entrainment and degenerated to a remnant low.

Cyclone Asna was a rare occurrence, in that it formed over land as a depression, intensified into a cyclone and moved into the Arabian Sea in the month of August. Only three similar incidents have happened since 1891; in 1976, 1964 and 1944.

== Effects ==
=== India ===
Many parts of Gujarat and Madhya Pradesh were flooded due to heavy rains from the storm. Up to 260 mm (10 in) of rain fell in Vadodara and Ahmedabad recorded 120 mm (4.7 in) of rainfall on 25–26 August. By 3 September 2024, Gujarat received almost 118% of the rainfall of the season. Kutch recorded more than 180% of the rainfall, while North Gujarat was around 94%. Vadodara, Jamnagar, Dwarka, Rajkot, Morbi and Bhuj cities were affected. Vadodara was heavily flooded due to rapid rise in the Vishwamitri river. Khambhaliya recorded 944 mm of rainfall in 25–31 August. Of 206 reservoirs in the state, 115 were at full storage capacity; 45 were between 70% and full capacity; and 17 were between 50% and 70%, following the rains. The Sardar Sarovar Dam reached 81% of the capacity. The total 86% of the all reservoir combined was filled. Several dams released waters to maintain the safe level of the waters in their reservoirs.

Flooding in Gujarat killed 49 people between 25 and 31 August. The flooding also resulted in the death of 2,618 livestock. Crops were destroyed in several districts in Kutch and Saurashtra regions. In Vadodara and elsewhere, there was extensive damage to houses, shops and businesses. 4,173 km of roads were damaged. Total 6,931 villages and 17 cities were affected by the loss of electricity. Total 88 substations were shut down during the flooding. An old bridge between Bodeli and Chhota Udepur on the national highway collapsed. An initial survey reported that the Government of Gujarat suffered damages worth more than ₹250 crore (US$30 million) to government properties and public infrastructure.

A study conducted by scientists at the Indian Institute of Technology Gandhinagar attributed that flooding in certain areas of the state to extreme weather and the impact of urban development. The study indicated that the changes in elevation and disruption of drainage systems caused by urbanization contributed to the flooding.

=== Pakistan ===
Meanwhile, in Pakistan, heavy rainfall accompanied by lightning was recorded across the Karachi division on September 2 and 3. Other affected areas included Sukkur, Larkana, Khairpur, Dadu, Jacobabad, Hyderabad, Thatta, Badin, Tando Allahyar, Tando Muhammad Khan, Tharparkar, Mirpurkhas, Umerkot, and Sanghar. At least 24 people have reportedly lost their lives in rain and wind-related incidents across the coastal regions of Sindh and Balochistan. Schools were closed in Karachi and Hyderabad, while several flights to Karachi were either cancelled or delayed.

== Aftermath ==
Total 17 teams of National Disaster Response Force, 27 teams of the State Disaster Response Force, nine columns from the Indian Army and additional teams of the Indian Air Force and the Indian Coast Guard were deployed for relief and rescue efforts. They rescued 37,050 people and relocated 42,083 people to safety. Total 53 people were airlifted.

The state government deployed total 1,120 teams to report the damages across the several districts of the state. The families of the deceased were provided the compensation of ₹4 lakh (US$4,200) each by the government. It also compensated for the death of livestock and distributed ₹1.78 crore (US$180,000). By 3 September 2024, the government also provided the cash relief to 1.69 lakh people; the assistance for household items to 50,111 families and the owners of 4,673 damaged houses and huts. Total ₹700 crore (US$73 million) were allocated to the municipalities for road repairs.

As Vishwamitri river overflowed, the crocodiles from the river entered the city of Vadodara. Total 42 crocodiles and more than 80 snakes were rescued from the city in a week preceding 3 September. The state government provided financial help to 64,360 families in the city and 20,610 families in the Vadodara district.

In October 2024, the government of Gujarat announced a relief package of ₹1,419.62 crore (US$150 million) for crop loss to farmers.

== See also ==
- List of Gujarat tropical cyclones
- Weather of 2024
- Tropical cyclones in 2024
