= Cyclones Gulab and Shaheen =

North Indian Ocean cyclones in 2021

Cyclonic Storm Gulab Severe Cyclonic Storm Shaheen
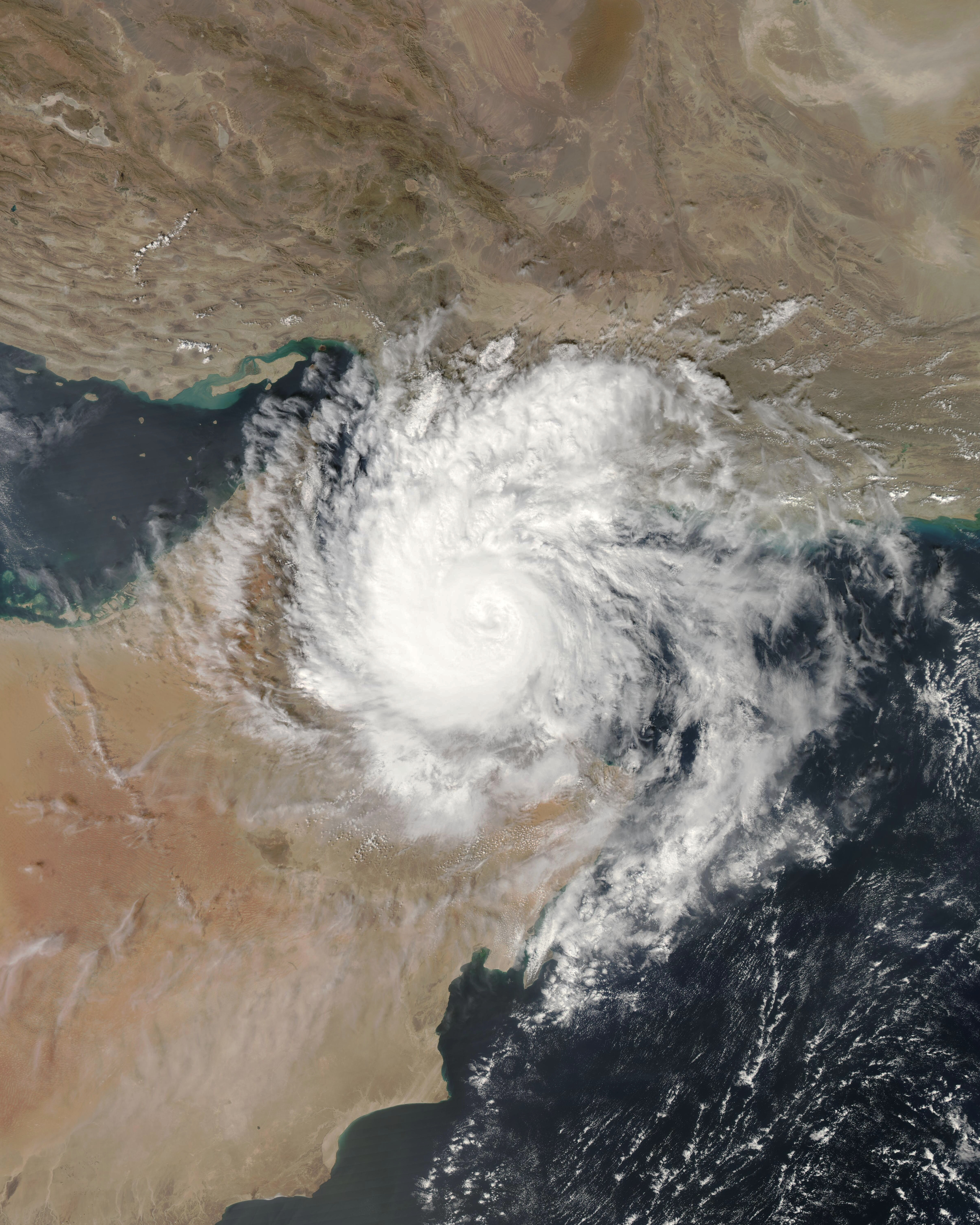
- Severe Cyclonic Storm Shaheen nearing landfall in Oman on 3 October

Meteorological history
- as Cyclonic Storm Gulab
- Formed: 24 September 2021
- Dissipated: 28 September 2021

Cyclonic storm
- 3-minute sustained (IMD)
- Highest winds: 85 km/h (50 mph)
- Lowest pressure: 992 hPa (mbar); 29.29 inHg

Tropical storm
- 1-minute sustained (SSHWS)
- Highest winds: 75 km/h (45 mph)
- Lowest pressure: 991 hPa (mbar); 29.26 inHg

Meteorological history
- as Severe Cyclonic Storm Shaheen
- Formed: 30 September 2021
- Dissipated: 4 October 2021

Severe cyclonic storm
- 3-minute sustained (IMD)
- Highest winds: 110 km/h (70 mph)
- Lowest pressure: 984 hPa (mbar); 29.06 inHg

Category 1-equivalent tropical cyclone
- 1-minute sustained (SSHWS/JTWC)
- Highest winds: 130 km/h (80 mph)
- Lowest pressure: 976 hPa (mbar); 28.82 inHg

Overall effects
- Fatalities: 34 total
- Damage: $791 million
- Areas affected: Myanmar, Bangladesh, India, Pakistan, Baluchistan, Sindh, Oman, United Arab Emirates, eastern Saudi Arabia, Yemen
- IBTrACS
- Part of the 2021 North Indian Ocean cyclone season

Cyclonic Storm Gulab (Note: The name Gulab (Urdu: گلاب, [ɡʊlɑːb]) was contributed by Pakistan and means "rose" in Urdu.) and Severe Cyclonic Storm Shaheen (Note: The name Shaheen (Arabic: شاهين, [ʃaːhiːn]) was contributed by Qatar and refers to the peregrine falcon (Falco peregrinus) in Arabic.) were two tropical cyclones that caused considerable damage to South and West Asia during the 2021 North Indian Ocean cyclone season. Gulab impacted India and Pakistan, while Shaheen impacted Iran, Oman and the United Arab Emirates. Gulab was the third named storm of the 2021 North Indian Ocean cyclone season, as well as the fourth named storm of the season after its reformation in the Arabian Sea as Shaheen. The cyclone's origins can be traced back to a low-pressure area situated over the Bay of Bengal on 24 September. The Indian Meteorological Department (IMD) named this new cyclone Gulab. On 26 September, Gulab made landfall in the Indian state of Andhra Pradesh. Following landfall, Gulab weakened inland, degenerating into a remnant low on 28 September. The system continued moving westward, emerging over the Arabian Sea on 29 September, before regenerating into a depression early on 30 September. Early on 1 October, the system restrengthened into a Cyclonic Storm, which was named Shaheen. The system gradually strengthened as it entered the Gulf of Oman. While slowly moving westward, the storm turned southwestward, subsequently making an extremely rare landfall in Oman on 3 October as a Category 1-equivalent cyclone. Shaheen then rapidly weakened, before dissipating the next day.

The system overall brought heavy rain and strong winds throughout India, Pakistan and the Middle East. Water-related damage was extensive, while communications were disrupted as winds downed many power lines. Hundreds of roads were closed in India. Heavy rainfall occurred in Karachi, Pakistan. Shaheen delivered extreme rainfall to Oman, causing flooding across a wide area of the country's northeastern governorates. Muscat saw particularly heavy flooding, which submerged cars and other low-lying objects.

== Meteorological history ==
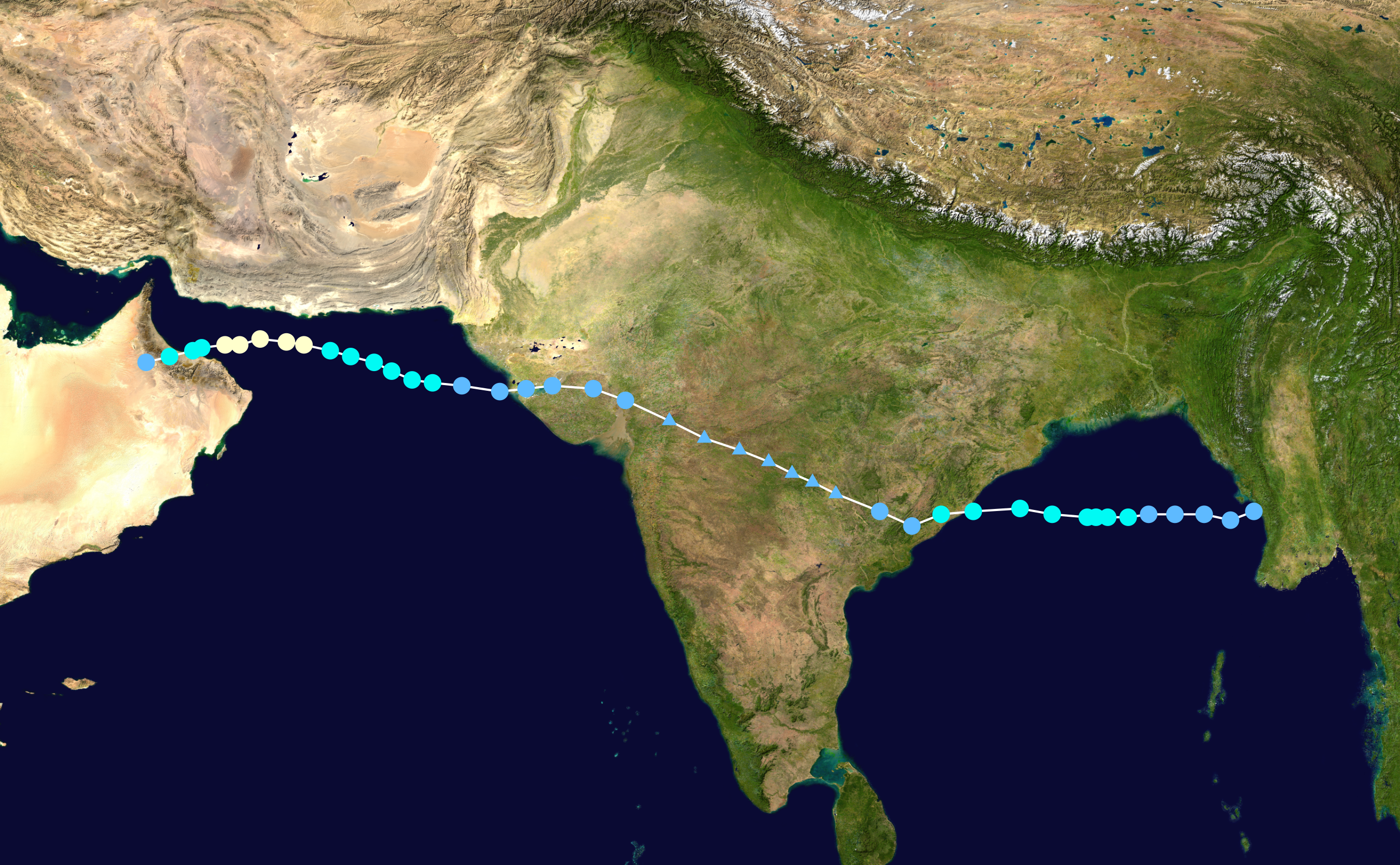
Map plotting the storm's track and intensity, according to the Saffir–Simpson scale Map key Saffir–Simpson scale Tropical depression (≤38 mph, ≤62 km/h) Tropical storm (39–73 mph, 63–118 km/h) Category 1 (74–95 mph, 119–153 km/h) Category 2 (96–110 mph, 154–177 km/h) Category 3 (111–129 mph, 178–208 km/h) Category 4 (130–156 mph, 209–251 km/h) Category 5 (≥157 mph, ≥252 km/h) Unknown Storm type Tropical cyclone Subtropical cyclone Extratropical cyclone, remnant low, tropical disturbance, or monsoon depression

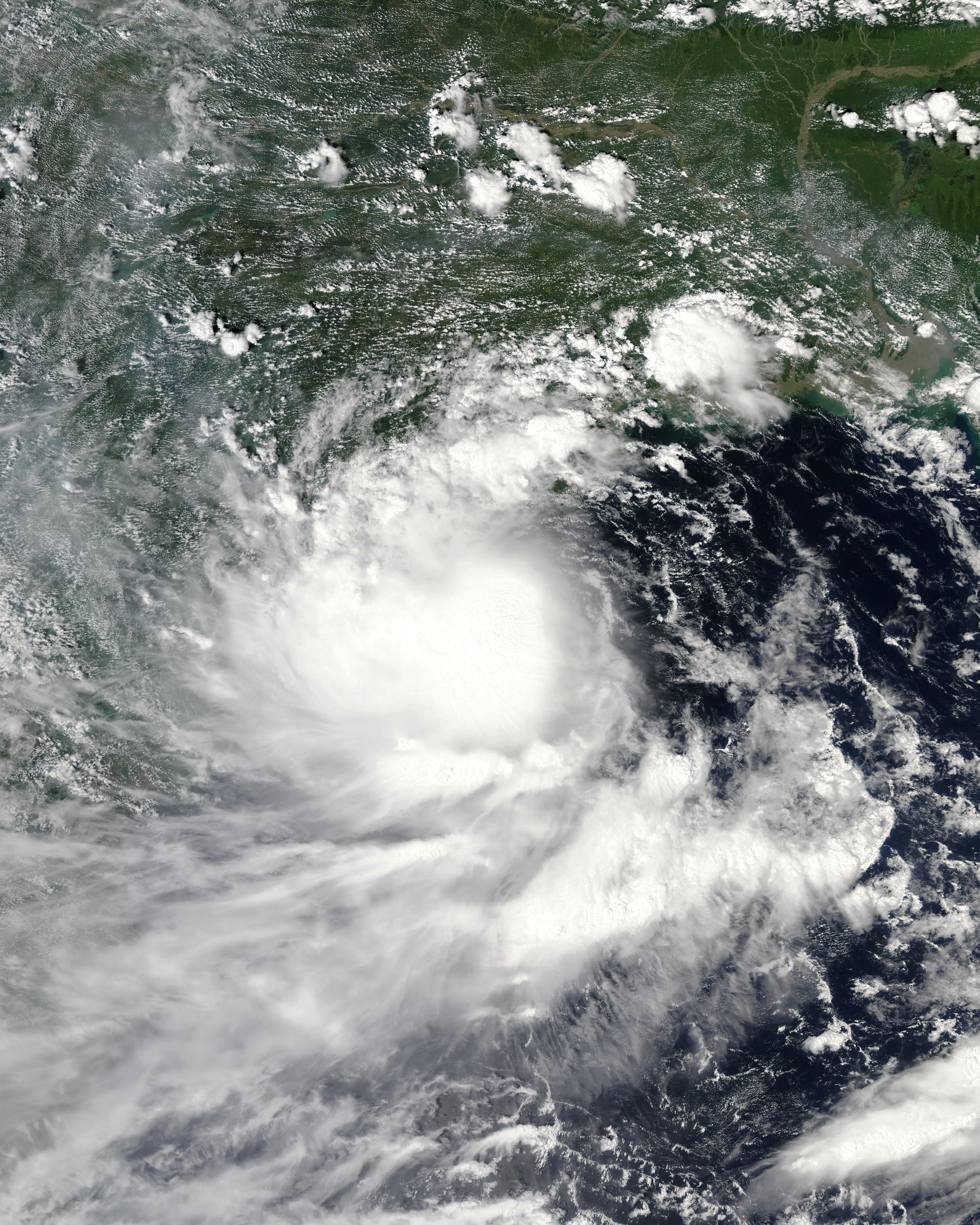
Cyclonic Storm Gulab in the Bay of Bengal on 26 September

=== Gulab ===
On 24 September, the Joint Typhoon Warning Center (JTWC) noted a cyclone that was producing tropical storm-force winds located over the east-central Bay of Bengal, 211 nmi (391 km; 243 mi) south of Chittagong, Bangladesh, designating the system as 03B. The India Meteorological Department (IMD) noted the system as a low-pressure area at 03:00 UTC (08:30 IST); the system formed from a cyclonic circulation which persisted over the Gulf of Martaban. It was later upgraded to a well-marked low-pressure area at 11:00 UTC (16:30 IST), as it developed a cyclonic vortex at 06:00 UTC (11:30 IST). At 15:00 UTC (20:30 IST), the IMD upgraded it to a Depression, as the convection had further organized and the storm's convection, or thunderstorms, were moving in a curved manner. Favorable conditions, such as moderate to high sea-surface temperatures, the Madden–Julian oscillation being favorable for tropical cyclone development, and low vertical wind shear, allowed intensification. By 03:00 UTC the next day, the system was upgraded to a Deep Depression, as its convection further organized near the center. There was also the presence of warm moist air over the center of the system, which was conducive for strengthening. At 15:00 UTC (20:30 IST), the IMD upgraded it to a Cyclonic Storm, as its convection had become better-organized, with a defined central dense overcast, naming the system named Gulab. As it continued westward, the outer rainbands of Cyclone Gulab reached the coastal regions of northern Andhra Pradesh and southern Odisha, which indicated that it had started making landfall, at about 18:00 IST (12:30 UTC) on 26 September. By 17:00 UTC (10:30 IST), it had crossed 20 km (10 mi) north of Kalingapatnam. At 21:00 UTC (02:30 IST), the JTWC issued its final warning prior to landfall. Three hours later, the IMD downgraded it to a deep depression, as it had lost its energy after travelling over rough Indian terrain. It further weakened into a depression by 20:00 IST (14:30 UTC), as it entered the state of Telangana. It maintained its intensity as it travelled westward, until at 14:00 IST (08:30 UTC), when it weakened into a well-marked low-pressure area over west Vidarbha.

=== Shaheen ===
As Cyclone Gulab weakened into a well-marked low-pressure area over western Vidarbha and its surrounding areas, the IMD noted that its remnants may cross the Arabian Sea and regenerate into a tropical cyclone. On 29 September at 17:30 UTC (23:00 IST), the system crossed the Arabian Sea, before the JTWC issued a Tropical Cyclone Formation Alert (TCFA) on the disturbance at 17:30 UTC (23:00 IST). At this time, the agency analyzed the system's environmental path as being conducive for tropical cyclogenesis, with warm sea surface temperatures of 30–31 °C (86–88 °F), enhanced outflow from an upper-level anticyclone and low wind shear. On the next day at 00:00 UTC (05:30 IST), while over the Gulf of Khambat, the IMD upgraded the system to a depression, with the agency designating the system as ARB 02. INSAT 3D satellite imagery at that time showed that the convection had increased near the storm's center. Later that day, at 18:00 UTC (23:30 IST), the IMD further upgraded the storm to a deep depression, while it was moving away from Gujarat; however, the JTWC continued issuing advisories on the system, referring to it as Gulab, with the agency reissuing advisories three hours later, with the system bearing maximum sustained winds of 40 knots (75 km/h; 45 mph).

On 1 October at 21:00 UTC (03:00 IST), the IMD reported that the system had further strengthened to a Cyclonic Storm, with the agency giving it the name Shaheen. The storm's spiral bands were seen wrapping along its obscured low-level circulation center (LLCC), while its Dvorak rating stood at T2.5 at that time. At 15:00 UTC (20:30 IST), the IMD further upgraded it to a severe cyclonic storm, as the clouds had become well-organized moving with a defined curved pattern. At 03:00 UTC (08:30 IST) the next day, the JTWC upgraded it to a Category 1 equivalent tropical cyclone, as it developed an eye; however, the system struggled to develop further, due to inadequate convection. By 06:00 UTC (11:30 IST), the cyclone developed a defined, but ragged eye. At 09:00 UTC (14:30 IST), the JTWC downgraded the cyclone to a tropical storm, but six hours later, the JTWC re-upgraded the system to a Category 1 tropical cyclone. Between 19:00 UTC and 20:00 UTC (00:30 IST and 01:30 IST) on 3 October, Shaheen made landfall over the northern Oman coast, making it possibly the only cyclone to make landfall there since 1890. At 21:00 UTC (02:30 IST), the JTWC issued its final warning for the storm, as it made landfall. After making landfall, Shaheen underwent rapid weakening, due to the dry landmass of the Arabian Desert. At 00:00 UTC (05:30 IST), Shaheen weakened to a cyclonic storm and three hours later it further weakened into a deep depression. Satellite imagery showed that the cloud mass had become disorganized. Shaheen rapidly weakened after landfall as it moved further inland, weakening into a depression on 4 October before degenerating into a well-marked low later that day.

== Preparations ==
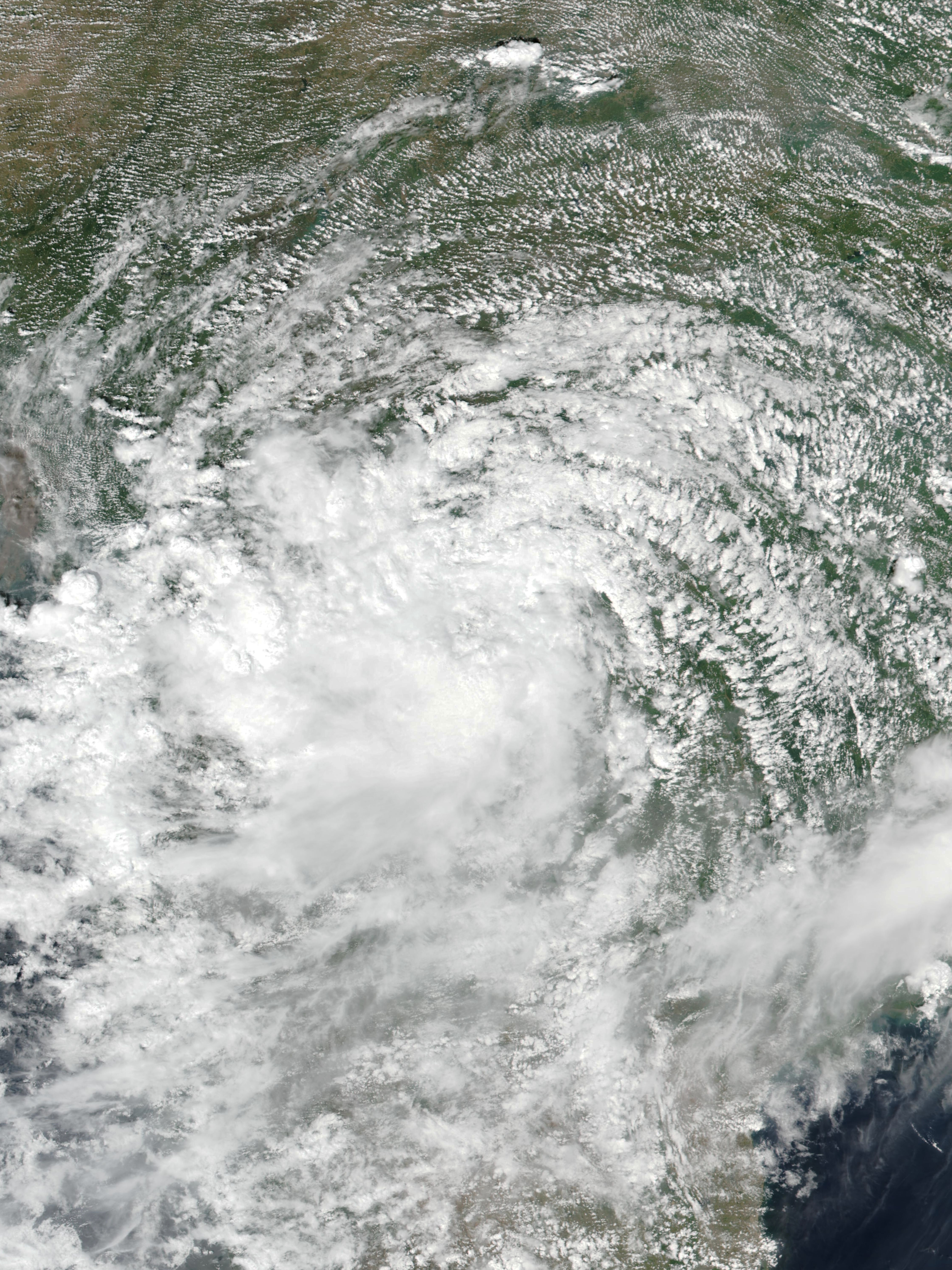
Gulab over Western India on 28 September, as a well-marked low-pressure area.

=== Gulab ===
==== Odisha ====
Due to Gulab, the National Disaster Response Force (NDRF) and State Disaster Response Force (SDRF) of Odisha were put on alert and the IMD put the state into high alert. As of 26 September, over 30,000 individuals evacuated into safety as a result of the cyclone; this number further increased to 46,075 people as the storm further moved inland. Trains running through the area and neighbor Andhra Pradesh were also canceled.

=== Shaheen ===
==== Pakistan ====
Due to the brewing storm, which would become Shaheen, the Pakistan Meteorological Department (PMD) issued a tropical cyclone warning for the country on 30 September, with the agency predicting heavy rains and strong winds in the Sindh-Makran coastal areas. The agency also noted that sea conditions were risky for fishermen, advising them to avoid fishing activities until further notice. The education department of Sindh also canceled classes and activities in private and government institutions until 1 October. Karachi Commissioner Naveed Ahmad Shaikh recommended that all deputy commissioners should remove all dangerous panels and hoards on buildings and roofings from their respective districts as a precaution. He also warned people of the city to avoid venturing outside and on beaches due to the storm. There is also a ban that the commissioner imposed about going on to beaches that will last until 5 October. Karachi also announced a holiday on 1 October, as a result of the brewing cyclone.

==== Oman ====
Flights and traffic were delayed and rescheduled to and from the capital city, Muscat. Traffic was also halted between North and South Batina governorates as a result of Shaheen. 55 emergency shelters in Muscat were also prepared for the evacuees and authorities declared 3–4 October to be a work holiday due to the storm. The National Committee for Emergency Management (NCEM) also warned individuals within Shaheen's track to evacuate immediately; as of 3 October, 2,734 persons were now in government and other safety shelters to ride out the storm. 40-60 knot-winds and 200 to 500mm rainfall were also forecasted to impact the country. Its medical response were also heightened as the storm approached. A Cricket match between Oman and Scotland had to be abandoned due to Shaheen's potential impacts.

==== United Arab Emirates ====
The Dubai Municipality announced temporary closure of Hatta Parks and other community facilities, while schools in the area shifted to distance learning. The National Centre of Meteorology issued a code red alert off the eastern coast with a warning of 10-foot waves off-shore and wind speeds of 50 km/h (30 mph). A dust storm alert was also issued due to Shaheen on 4 October. Warning messages were broadcast in 19 languages, a strategy that involved more than 100 local and national entities. In Al Ain, residents were warned that they may have to briefly work from home, and have schools switch to distance learning temporarily. A large social media effort attempted to reach warnings and information about Shaheen as possible.

==== Saudi Arabia ====
Saudi Arabia was expecting to see torrential rainfall and thunderstorms from Shaheen, after it made landfall on Oman.

== Impacts ==
=== Gulab ===
At least 20 total deaths have been attributed to Gulab, as well as ₹20 billion (US$271 million) in damages.

==== Odisha ====
Trees were uprooted and some houses were damaged. A landslide occurred on National Highway 26 near Ralegada, Koraput, causing traffic and disruptions; however, the district's administration quickly restored the road. An overnight downpour flooded a portion of National Highway 26 near a government hospital, but a team from the Odisha Disaster Rapid Action Force (ODRAF) rescued the people inside. On 27 September, rainfall of 148 mm (5.8 in) was recorded at Pottangi, 89.4 mm (3.52 in) at Mahendragarh and 77.2 mm (3.04 in) at Mohana, Gajapati. No fatalities were reported.

==== Andhra Pradesh ====
Gulab also caused severe damages in the districts of Srikakulam and Vizianagaram in Andhra Pradesh. It caused disruption of communication and electricity due to traffic jams and trees downed. Vizianagaram was flooded with waterlogging due to a bad subterranean drainage system, with hundreds of trees and signs falling elsewhere. Heavy precipitation in Vizag led to regional floods and rainwater winds that led to various trees and saplings being uprooted. The Visakhapatnam Airport was also flooded by heavy rainfall. The downpour in the city became the second-wettest in modern records which stood to 282 mm (11.1 in), only took place behind Cyclone Pyarr of 2005. 2 fishermen in the state were killed while one was reported missing. About 102,000 acres (41,000 ha) of crop was destroyed by Gulab, resulting in ₹1 billion (US$13.6 million) of damage.

==== Telangana ====
Due to Gulab, the Godavari River's water level increased to the first mark on 30 September at 43.90 ft (13.38 m). An individual with a bullock cart drowned in Munneru stream on Kothagudem on 29 September, following heavy rains.

=== Shaheen ===
At least 14 deaths have been attributed to Shaheen.

==== Gujarat ====
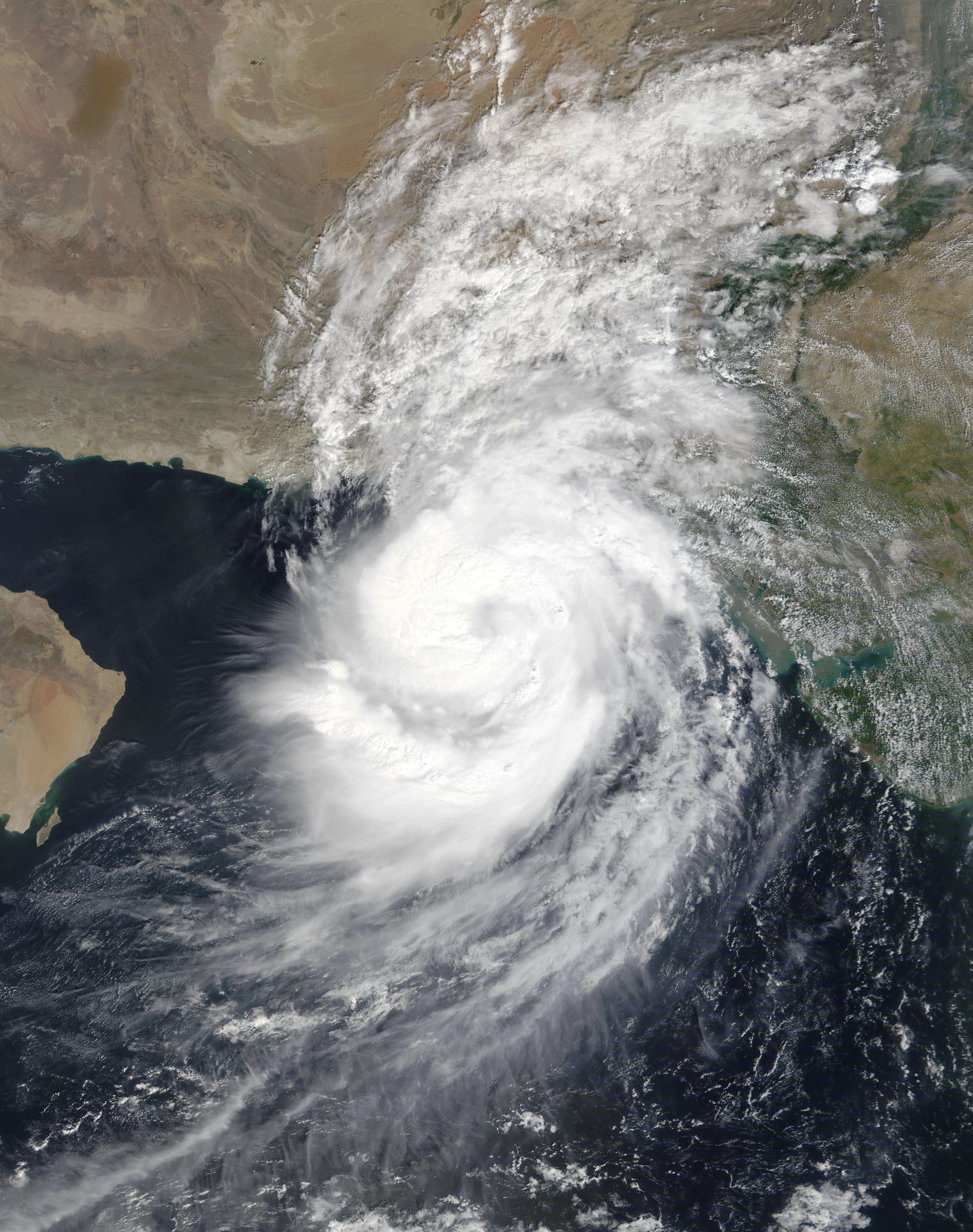
Severe Cyclonic Storm Shaheen strengthening in the Arabian Sea on 1 October

As the system moved over the Indian state of Gujarat as the remnants of Gulab, heavy rains fell over the area, with Valsad and Kaprada both recording 6 in (150 mm) of downpour and Umarpada at 8.72 in (221 mm) on 29 September, with the former being flooded. Underpasses and roadways were also inundated in the area. As a result, 20 teams of National Disaster Response Force (NDRF's) were deployed in the whole state for possible continuous rains. 194 tehsils also reported torrential rainfall, with Palsana in Surat collecting 7 in (180 mm) of downpour. Over 100 water reservoirs were put under alert as a result. Street flooding and rivers increasing their capacities due to dams releasing water. Yellow alerts were placed in 20 districts while 6 places were under orange alert as of 29 September. The Indian Coast Guard also warned fishermen not to venture in the seas affected by the storm in at least three days. Visavadar recorded a 24-hour period rainfall of 10 in (250 mm) from 29 to 30 September, and the Gir Forest received 12 in (300 mm) of rain during the same period, which flooded the Sonarakh River in Junagadh.

Continued rains in the state forced the closure of 140 state roads, 207 roads in 20 districts and 14 state highways. Tithal Beach in Valsad were also closed. Nine more small irrigation dams overflowed in Kutch district as a result of three-day rains in the area while boats in the Arabian Sea were asked to return to ports for safety; 363 of them obeyed it while 474 remained in sea and were expected to return to ports by 4 October.

==== Pakistan ====
The cyclone caused light downpours and gusty winds in parts of Karachi on 30 September. The city's Millennium Mall on Rashid Minhas Road also saw heavy traffic due to three electric poles falling on the area. The traffic police removed them immediately as a result. Another pole impacted a car in the parking lot of Frere Hall. A maximum wind speed of 69 km/h (43 mph) were recorded in the city. On the fishing village in Ibrahim Hyderi, five fishermen were rescued as their fishing boat capsized in the manner of high seas as a result of the system. Gulshan-e-Hadeed recorded the highest rainfall from the system at 39 mm (1.5 in) while the first fatality from the system were recorded when an individual was electrocuted, as reported by the rescue officials in Orangi Subdivision. Several roadways were also inundated with floodwaters in Karachi.

==== Iran ====
Cyclone Shaheen brought heavy rainfall to Iran, six people were also killed in the Chabahar Port. There was also damage to electrical facilities and roads. Five fishermen were missing after two fishing vessels sank off the coast of Sistan and Baluchestan Province, local medias in the country reported. 13 injuries were also injured due to several wind damages. In Sistan and Baluchestan Province, over 122 people were hospitalized due to a dust storm brought by the cyclone. Eye, heart, and lung problems were among those in the hospital.

==== Oman ====
Maximum wind speed reached 93 mph (150 km/h), and the tallest waves stretched 32 ft (9.8 m).

"There are no words to express the situation. Shaheen has wreaked havoc with wadis overflowing and most of the houses, roads, shops and cars flooded"

— Hammam al Badi, a resident from Saham while clearing the path to his house on October 4.

A child who had gone missing during the flooding was found dead in Wilayah of Al Amarat. Another person, also in Muscat, is reported missing. Two foreign workers were killed when a hill collapsed on their house, while more than 5,000 people were put up in emergency shelters. 290.8 mm (11.45 in) of downpour were recorded in Suwaiq, a wilayat and Al-Khaboura at 167.9 mm (6.61 in). A building also collapsed in Suwaiq on October 4, with unknown workers inside; no fatalities were recorded. Many houses were inundated with floods, forcing people to climb on their roofs for safety. Several wadis and reefs in the country also overflowed due to heavy rains.

Coastal areas were also affected by storm surges from Shaheen. 369 mm (14.5 in) of downpour were reported in the wilayat of Al-Khaboura, the highest in association with the storm, as of October 4. The Royal Oman Police rescued two people stranded in a wadi in Suwaiq on October 4 while the Al-Khoud dam was reported to be overflowed due to heavy rains. Authorities of the Civil Defence and Ambulance (CDAA) also saved several people who were stuck inside their vehicles. 52 mph (84 km/h) winds were recorded on Suwaiq on October 3 and 36 mph (58 km/h) sustained winds and gusts up to 51 mph (82 km/h) were reported on Muscat International Airport at that day.

In total, at least 14 people died in Oman. Many towns and cities saw their average annual rainfall or more in just one day or less. Dams overflowed, and there were multiple reports of landslides across the affected regions. Roads were blocked due to flooding and other debris. Mud also collected in flooded areas. Muscat had seen flooding in several areas, along with felled trees and other structural damage. However, the city mostly returned to normal the next day.

It was estimated that more than 1,000 houses were damaged, with a preliminary estimated damage of about OMR30–50 million (US$78–130 million). The Ministry of Finance finalized the damage at OMR200 million (US$520 million).

==== United Arab Emirates ====
Only light rainfall was recorded in parts of Al Ain, Hatta, and Ajman, due to the storm. There were also some reports of slightly increased winds, with overall damage being minor.

==== Yemen ====
The remnant of Cyclone Shaheen caused heavy rainfall in Yemen, damaging historical sites. It was reported that 20 vehicles were washed away by flash flooding.

== Aftermath ==
=== Shaheen ===
==== Oman ====
Sohar Port's marine operations, ports, and crude loading operations re-opened on October 4. Contingency plans that were put in place before Shaheen helped lessen impacts. The Central Bank of Oman announced on October 5 that it would allocate OMR7 million (US$18.2 million) to people who were affected by Shaheen, also calling on all banks to help mitigate the effects of the cyclone. The bank confirmed that it would coordinate with government agencies to transfer the funds needed. His Majesty Abdullah II of Jordan expressed condolences over the victims of Shaheen the same day. Helicopters patrolled inundated areas and rescued those affected, including one prisoner from a rooftop in Suwayq. Oman's armed forces helped with several rescues.

Due to a widespread lack of home insurance in Oman, many feared that money raised from private funds would not be enough to cover repairs. At least 5,000 people were put into 80 temporary shelters. Relief workers said that the clean-up operation in Batinah region could take months.

== See also ==
- Weather of 2021
- Tropical cyclones in 2021
- List of Gujarat tropical cyclones
- Cyclone Gonu – Strongest cyclone on record in the Arabian Sea which was the last cyclone to enter the Gulf of Oman, prior to Shaheen
- Cyclone Yemyin – Took a similar track, made landfall in India and Pakistan respectively
- Cyclone Vardah – A cyclone that also crossed the Indian subcontinent and regenerated in the Arabian Sea
- Tropical Depression Wilma (2013) – A long-lived system that cross over from the West Pacific into the Bay of Bengal and then the Arabian sea
