= 1888 Arabian Sea cyclone =

North Indian Ocean cyclone in 1888

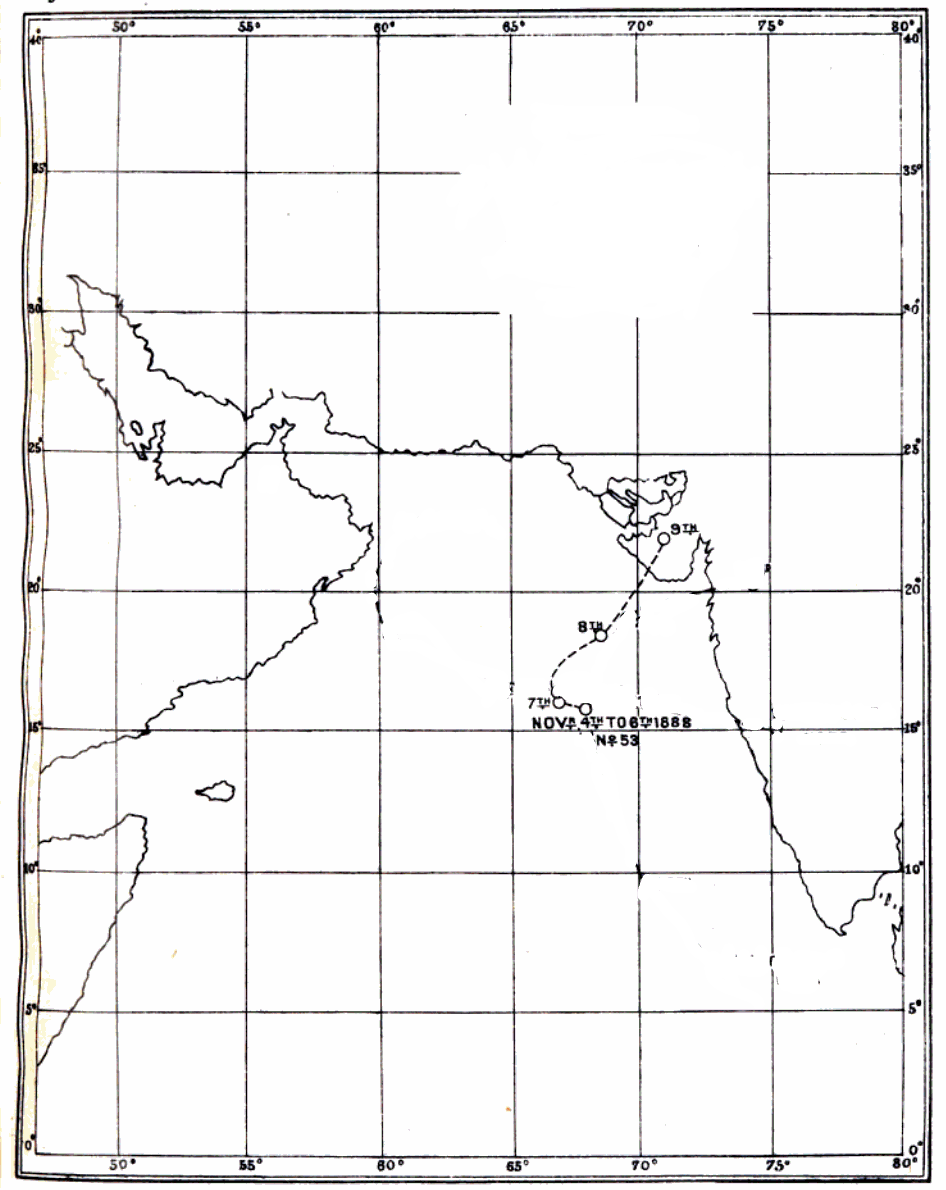
- Track of the cyclone

Meteorological history
- Formed: 4 November 1888
- Dissipated: 10 November 1888

Unknown-strength storm
- 3-minute sustained (IMD)

Unknown-strength storm
- 1-minute sustained (SSHWS/JTWC)

Overall effects
- Missing: 740+
- Areas affected: Kathiawar (now in Gujarat), India

The 1888 Arabian Sea cyclone was a tropical cyclone that affected Kathiawar coast (now Gujarat) of India from 4 to 10 November 1888. The cyclonic storm had formed in the Arabian Sea and later moved northeastwards before making landfall on the Kathiawar coast. More than 740 people went missing when a ship SS Vaitarna disappeared in the storm during a crossing from Mandvi to Bombay.

== Meteorological history ==
The storm reached Madras (now Chennai) on the evening about 10:30 PM of the 31 October 1888. On that day in the Arabian Sea the weather was unsettled. Over the north and centre moderate to strong north east winds were blowing and over the south strong south west winds. Between these two regions there was apparently an area of variable winds and squally weather.

The storm, when it crossed the Madras coast, was moving at a rate of about 10 miles per hour. By 8 AM on the 1 November, the centre lay in Latitude 13° 30' N and Longitude 79° E its rate of motion since crossing the coast having been not more than 8 miles per hour. Observations at 4 PM on the same day 1st show that the centre had not changed its position. The observations over the Arabian Sea show the continuance of a large area of squally perhaps stormy weather over the centre of the Arabian Sea. The winds there were the same as on the 31 November and it is evident that this squally area was in no way connected with the storm lying over the centre of the Peninsula as the weather on the Bombay coast was fine with light winds.

On the morning of the 2 November 1888, the observations indicated a somewhat irregular cyclonic circulation and area of depression off the Malabar coast but this depression was not the direct continuation of the storm which was shown between Kadapa and Bangalore on the evening and which had probably broken up. The observations of 2 November over the Arabian Sea showed the same general conditions as the 1 November but in the centre of the sea the weather was even stormy than on the previous day. There was thus a marked towards the establishment of a cyclonic storm but the disturbance to this date was of that diffused character which marks the stages of a cyclone. The observations of the 3 November apparently that a small area of depression lay off the west coast and was northward almost parallel to the coast and at the same time was also shown a shallow area of depression in about Latitude 14° N Longitude 52° E. It is probable that a trough of relatively low pressure representing the large area of squally weather previously noticed extended between these two depressions. The western was probably a cyclonic storm developed under the favourable conditions noticed above the eastern depression probably represented effect due to the westward transmission of the general originating out of the storm which passed Madras on the evening the 31 October and its absorption into the area of previously existing in the Arabian Sea. The observations of the 4 November showed that a large shallow depression extending from Longitude 62° E to the Bombay coast and from Latitude 12° N to Latitude 18° N. The centre of this depression was in about Latitude 16° N Longitude 68° E. The disturbance was still diffused and irregular. On the 5 November, the centre of depression over the Arabian Sea was nearly in the same position as on the 4 November, viz. Latitude 16° N Long 68° E. The depression was however intensifying and developing into severe cyclonic storm but because it was concentrating the weather outside the storm area was improving. On the disturbance beyond covering a smaller area than on the day was unchanged in character or intensity. The centre still lay Latitude 16° N and Longitude 68° 30' E. On the 7 November, the observations apparently that the depression had moved a little distance westward but later in the day the centre commenced to travel northward by midnight had reached Latitude 17° 45' N. Stormy weather and a circulation was experienced by the few ships in the neighbourhood the disturbance. The chart of the 8 November showed that a slight northerly movement had occurred but it was not possible to fix exact position of the storm centre at noon on this day as the vessel which was near the centre did not record her position storm was one of very considerable intensity but was of small extent so that at distances of 100 to 150 miles from the centre the winds only force 4 (Beaufort scale). Later in the day (4 PM) the increased quickly on the Kathiawar coast and during the night with the force of a gale. On the 9th at about 8 AM, the centre the storm crossed the Kathiawar coast and by noon when the storm was quickly filling up it lay over Central Kathiawar.

== Effects ==
SS Vaitarna, popularly known as Vijli or Haji Kasam ni Vijli, disappeared and presumably sunk on 8 November 1888 off the coast of Kathiawar of Gujarat during this cyclonic storm during a crossing from Mandvi to Bombay. More than 740 people on board went missing in the disaster.

== See also ==
- List of Gujarat tropical cyclones
- 1975 Porbandar cyclone
- 1998 Gujarat cyclone
- Cyclone Tauktae
