= 1998 Gujarat cyclone =

North Indian cyclone in 1998

Extremely Severe Cyclonic Storm ARB 02
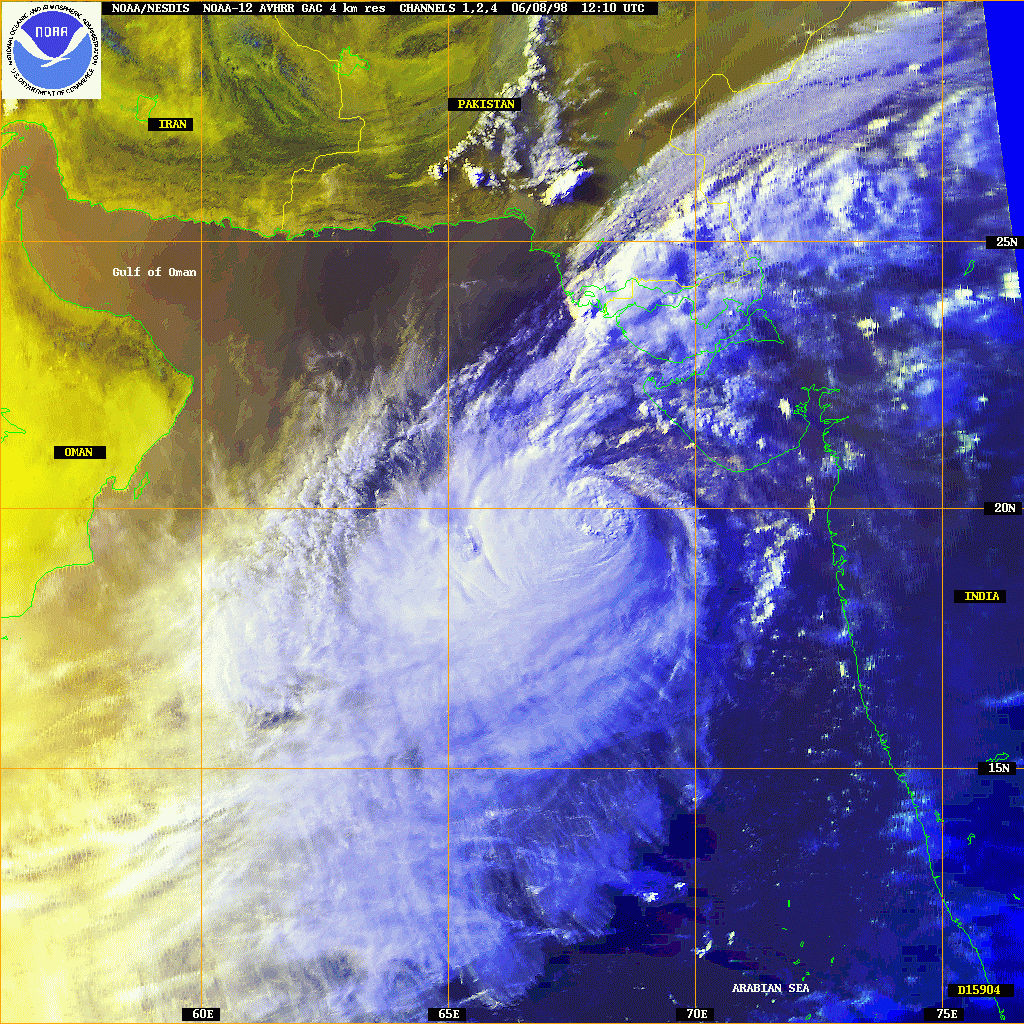
- The cyclone at peak intensity before landfall on the Sindh-Gujarat border on 8 June.

Meteorological history
- Formed: 4 June 1998
- Dissipated: 10 June 1998

Extremely severe cyclonic storm
- 3-minute sustained (IMD)
- Highest winds: 165 km/h (105 mph)
- Lowest pressure: 958 hPa (mbar); 28.29 inHg

Category 3-equivalent tropical cyclone
- 1-minute sustained (SSHWS/JTWC)
- Highest winds: 195 km/h (120 mph)

Overall effects
- Fatalities: 1,173 (confirmed); 4,000-10,000 (estimated)
- Missing: 1,774
- Damage: $3 billion
- Areas affected: India and Pakistan
- IBTrACS
- Part of the 1998 North Indian Ocean cyclone season

The 1998 Gujarat cyclone (Joint Typhoon Warning Center designation: 03A; India Meteorological Department designation: ARB 02) was a catastrophic tropical cyclone that killed at least 1,000 people in India, mainly in the state of Gujarat in 1998.

== Meteorological history ==
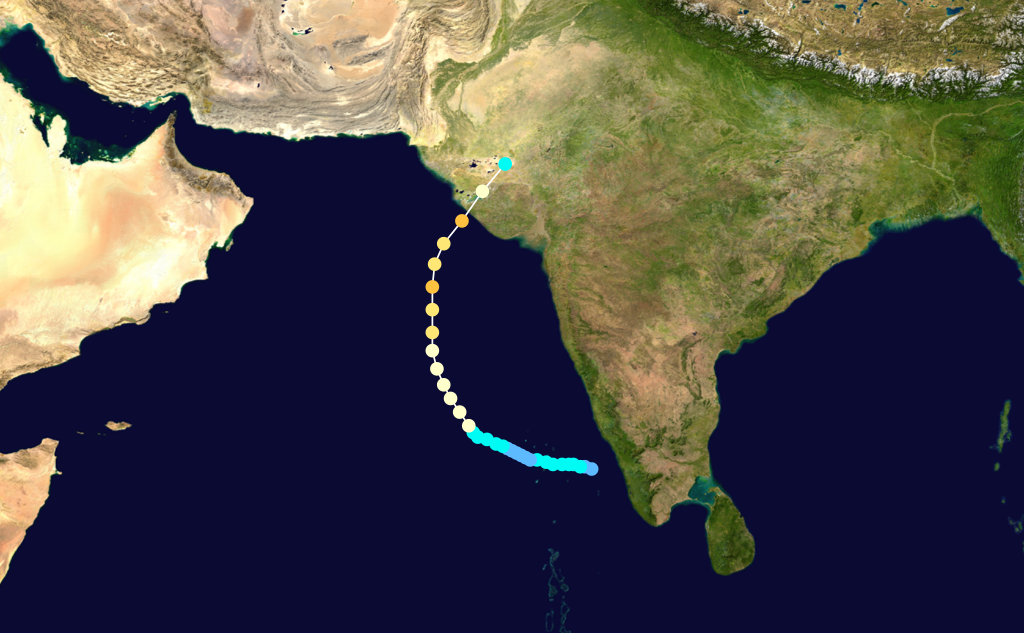
Map plotting the storm's track and intensity, according to the Saffir–Simpson scale Map key Saffir–Simpson scale Tropical depression (≤38 mph, ≤62 km/h) Tropical storm (39–73 mph, 63–118 km/h) Category 1 (74–95 mph, 119–153 km/h) Category 2 (96–110 mph, 154–177 km/h) Category 3 (111–129 mph, 178–208 km/h) Category 4 (130–156 mph, 209–251 km/h) Category 5 (≥157 mph, ≥252 km/h) Unknown Storm type Tropical cyclone Subtropical cyclone Extratropical cyclone, remnant low, tropical disturbance, or monsoon depression

On June 1, an area of low pressure developed over the Laccadive Islands. Two days later, the JTWC issued a TCFA for the system as it became better organized. Early on June 4, the JTWC issued its first advisory on Tropical Cyclone 03A. Around the same time, the IMD began monitoring the system as Depression ARB 02. Shortly after, the depression was upgraded to a deep depression and further strengthened into a cyclonic storm the following day. The small storm moved slowly towards the west and weakened as wind shear began to increase. The storm weakened below tropical storm intensity later that day and the initial final advisory was issued. However, the system redeveloped and advisories resumed the next day. The storm gradually intensified as it moved towards the northwest.

Dvorak satellite intensity estimates on June 6 reached T4.0, corresponding to an intensity of 120 km/h (75 mph). The IMD also marked the increase in intensity, upgrading ARB 02 to a severe cyclonic storm. Around this time, the storm began to turn towards the north and accelerate due to an approaching mid-level trough. As the storm neared the Indian coastline, an eye developed and the storm strengthened into the equivalent of a major hurricane with winds reaching 185 km/h (115 mph). The IMD assessed the storm to be a very severe cyclonic storm at this time, with winds up to 165 km/h (105 mph) and a barometric pressure of 958 mbar (hPa). After slightly weakening early on June 9, 03A re-strengthened, attaining its peak intensity with winds of 195 km/h (120 mph). Then it made landfall near Porbandar in the Indian state of Gujarat between 01:00 and 02:00 UTC. The storm weakened following landfall and the JTWC issued their final advisory later that day. The IMD continued to monitor ARB 02 until June 10, by which time it had weakened to a depression before dissipating.

== Impact and aftermath ==
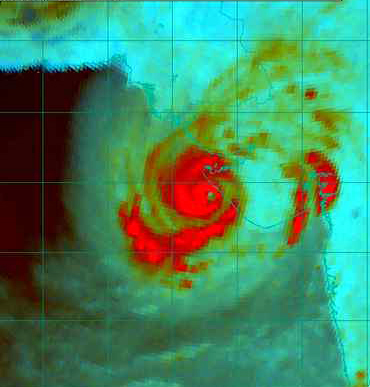
Microwave image of the cyclonic storm

Tropical Cyclone 03A brought a large storm surge of 4.9 m (16 ft) which devastated coastal communities and salt mines. An estimated 4,000 to 10,000 people were killed by the storm, many of whom were salt mine workers who did not own a radio and received little or no warning of the cyclone. The large loss of life was partially attributed to contractors who wanted to continue making profits and did not inform their workers of the approaching storm. According to the official figures, 1,173 people died and 1,774 people went missing. Also, the region had witnessed only 17 cyclones since 1890, all of which were weaker than 03A. As a result, its vulnerability was miscalculated by the local population and the disaster management administration. Power supply to numerous residences was lost due to the storms high winds. A microwave tower in Porbandar collapsed, causing widespread disruption in telecommunication. Hundreds of other power transmission towers also fell, causing an estimated loss of Rs 10 billion for the Gujarat Electricity Board. At least 893 people were injured by the storm and over 11,000 animals were killed. Over 162,000 structures were damaged or destroyed throughout the affected area and damages amounted to Rs. 120 billion (US$3 billion). In Kandla, the damages were estimated around ₹1,855.33 crore (equivalent to ₹84 billion or US$870 million in 2023).

Over the next one month, insurance companies had lost approximately Rs. 13 billion (US$266.5 million). The remnants of the storm produced heavy rains over Pakistan which electrocuted 12 people. In the wake of the storm, the United States Government provided US$25,000 for rehabilitation of the affected population. The Government of Denmark also contributed $72,992 in funds for relief efforts. The Gujarat government deployed approximately 330 medical teams to the affected areas. Local aid, amounting to Rs 1 billion (US$20.5 million) was provided to assist victims.

== See also ==
- List of Gujarat tropical cyclones
- 1888 Arabian Sea cyclone
- 1975 Porbandar cyclone
- 1998 North Indian Ocean cyclone season
- 1999 Pakistan cyclone
- Cyclone Nilofar
- Cyclone Vayu
- Cyclone Tauktae
- Cyclone Biparjoy
