= 1999 Pakistan cyclone =

North Indian cyclone in 1999

Extremely Severe Cyclonic Storm ARB 01
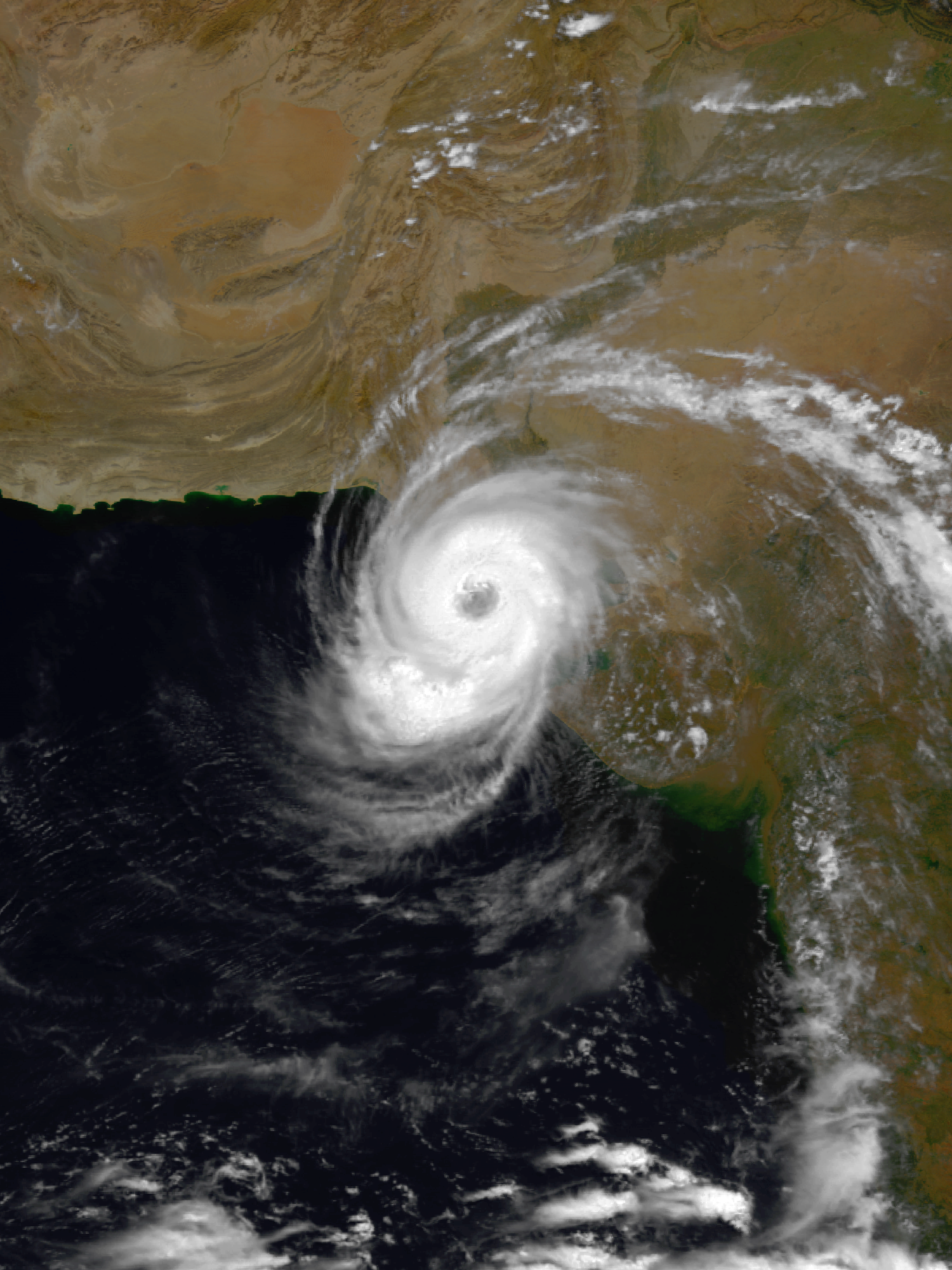
- Satellite image of the cyclone at peak intensity making landfall in Pakistan on 20 May.

Meteorological history
- Formed: 16 May 1999
- Dissipated: 22 May 1999

Extremely severe cyclonic storm
- 3-minute sustained (IMD)
- Highest winds: 195 km/h (120 mph)
- Lowest pressure: 946 hPa (mbar); 27.94 inHg

Category 3-equivalent tropical cyclone
- 1-minute sustained (SSHWS/JTWC)
- Highest winds: 205 km/h (125 mph)

Overall effects
- Fatalities: 6,400 total
- Damage: $6 million
- Areas affected: India and Pakistan
- IBTrACS
- Part of the 1999 North Indian Ocean cyclone season

The 1999 Pakistan cyclone (JTWC designation: 02A; IMD designation: ARB 01) was a deadly tropical cyclone that brought further devastation to a region struck by a powerful storm nearly a year earlier. It caused flooding and landslides and destroyed many villages. The disaster killed over 6,000 people and affected more than 2 million.

== Meteorological history ==
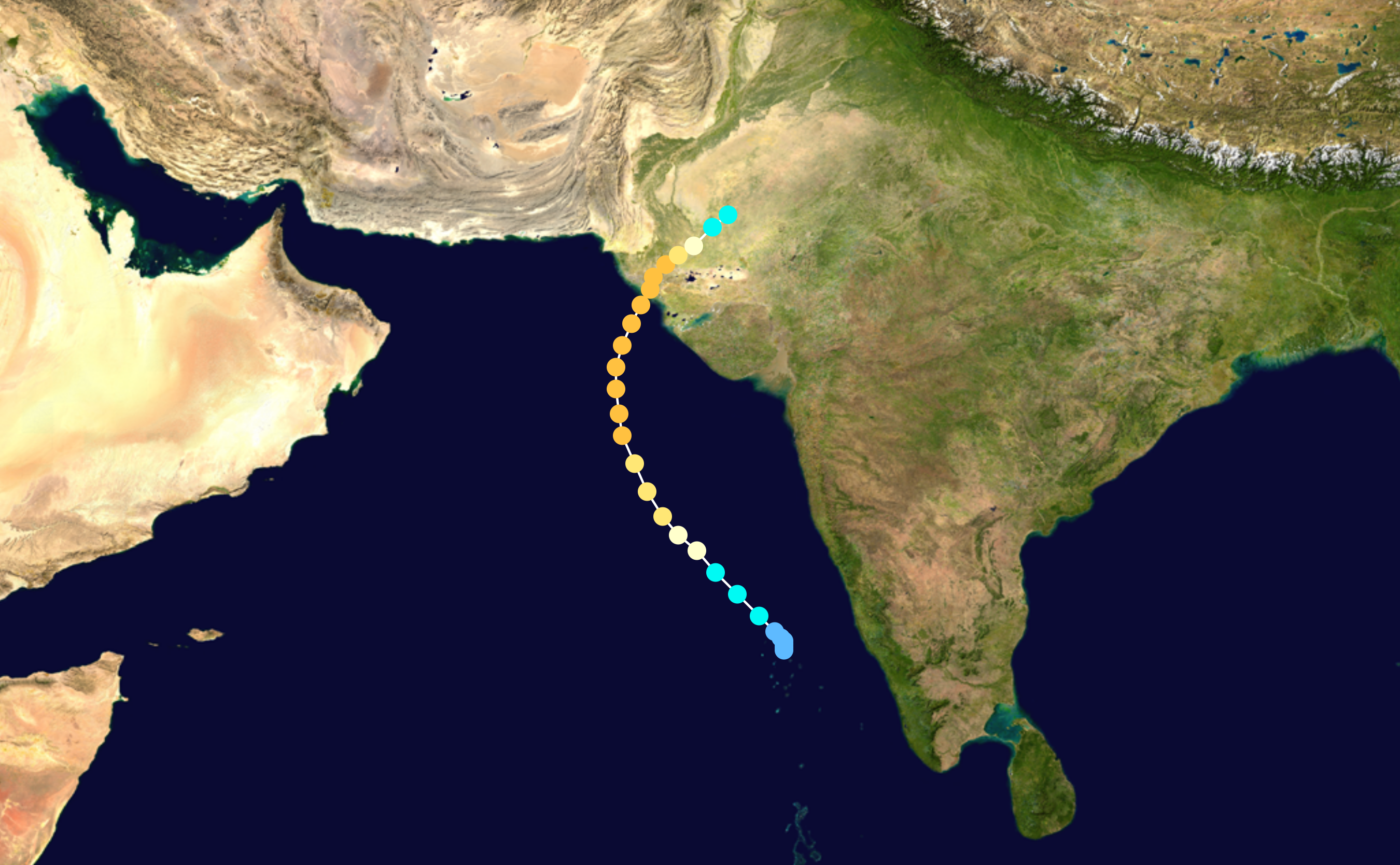
Map plotting the storm's track and intensity, according to the Saffir–Simpson scale Map key Saffir–Simpson scale Tropical depression (≤38 mph, ≤62 km/h) Tropical storm (39–73 mph, 63–118 km/h) Category 1 (74–95 mph, 119–153 km/h) Category 2 (96–110 mph, 154–177 km/h) Category 3 (111–129 mph, 178–208 km/h) Category 4 (130–156 mph, 209–251 km/h) Category 5 (≥157 mph, ≥252 km/h) Unknown Storm type Tropical cyclone Subtropical cyclone Extratropical cyclone, remnant low, tropical disturbance, or monsoon depression

In the Arabian Sea, the India Meteorological Department monitored an area of disturbed weather in early May for possible development. Strong convection developed over the next two weeks, and by 16 May, the convection had become constant, and the Joint Typhoon Warning Center issued a Tropical Cyclone Formation Alert (TCFA) at 0100Z. The low became a tropical storm by 0900Z, and was designated as Tropical Storm 02A. It intensified as it moved northwest and reached cyclone status on 17 May at 0600Z. A mid-latitude trough weakened the subtropical ridge, allowing 02A to curve into Pakistan. 02A continued to intensify, and by 19 May, it had reached its peak of 125 mph (200 km/h), just below Category 4 status on the Saffir–Simpson scale. 02A made landfall on 20 May near Karachi, Pakistan at peak intensity. The storm began to weaken as it continued inland over the Indus River Valley on 21 May before dissipating the next day.

== Impact and aftermath ==
=== India ===
In India, officials evacuated more than 50,000 from coastal towns and cities as a precaution. However, the powerful cyclone caused relatively little damage during its passage. Moderate rainfall was recorded across Gujarat and only one person was killed. Some areas were cut off from the surrounding region after strong winds, estimated to have been between 120 and 150 km/h (75 and 93 mph) downed power lines.

=== Pakistan ===
Upon striking Pakistan, officials feared the worst, with memories of the deadly 1998 Gujarat cyclone fresh in their minds. Reports released hours after the storm moved inland stated that at least 700 people were feared to be dead and at least 3,500 were thought to be missing. Hundreds of villages along the coastline were inundated by the cyclone's large storm surge and flooding rains. High winds downed power lines throughout the region, severing communication with many affected cities. In Karachi 70 km winds lashed the city with only little showers. At least 70% of the rice crop was estimated to have been lost due to the cyclone. Near the storm's center, wind gusts were estimated to have reached 275 km/h (171 mph).

By May 23, officials in Pakistan recovered 200 bodies; 50 were found across islands of the mainland and 150 were in the Badin District. During a rescue attempt, 11 Pakistani soldiers were washed away in a swift current. None of the soldiers are believed to have survived the incident. Throughout the country, damage was estimated to have exceeded $6 million. By May 24, 400 bodies had been recovered but at least 6,000 more were known to be missing and believed dead. Many of these people are believed to have been swept out to sea.

Following the storm's destructive landfall, hundreds of soldiers from the Pakistan army were deployed to the region. They assisted in search and rescue operations as well as relocating survivors to shelters. According to the Associated Press, the Government of Pakistan made no attempts to evacuate residents before the cyclone made landfall, likely resulting in the large number of fatalities. At least $1 million in relief funds was to be supplied by the government.

== Records ==
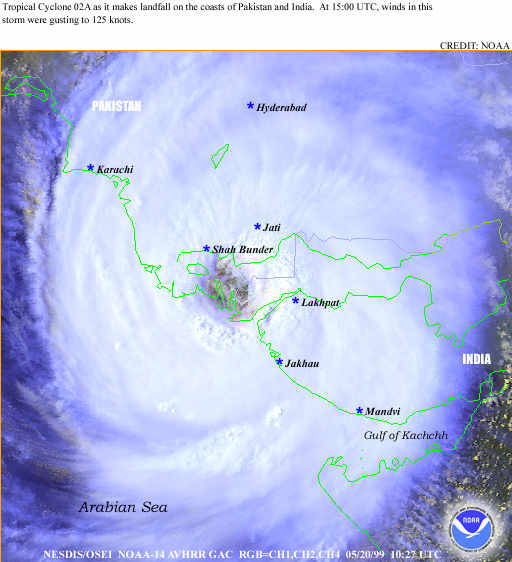
Close-up view of the storm

Upon reaching its peak intensity, the storm became the most intense cyclone ever recorded in the Arabian Sea since records began. It surpassed the record set just a year earlier by Extremely Severe Cyclonic Storm ARB 02 which attained winds of 165 km/h (105 mph 3-minute sustained) and a minimum pressure of 958 mbar (hPa; 28.29 inHg). Since then, the storm has been surpassed as the strongest in the region. In June 2007, Cyclone Gonu became the first Category 5-equivalent storm ever recorded in the area. Additionally, the JTWC estimated that another storm, Cyclone Phet in 2010, attained higher sustained winds than ARB 01 in 1999; however, the IMD does not support this as it is based on one minute mean. IMD calculate windspeed based on three-minute mean. This Cyclone is the only Major Cyclone and Extremely Severe Cyclone to make Landfall in Pakistan.

== See also ==
- 1999 North Indian Ocean cyclone season
- 1998 Gujarat cyclone
- Cyclone Tauktae
- List of Gujarat tropical cyclones
