= Cyclone Vayu =

North Indian cyclone in 2019

Very Severe Cyclonic Storm Vayu
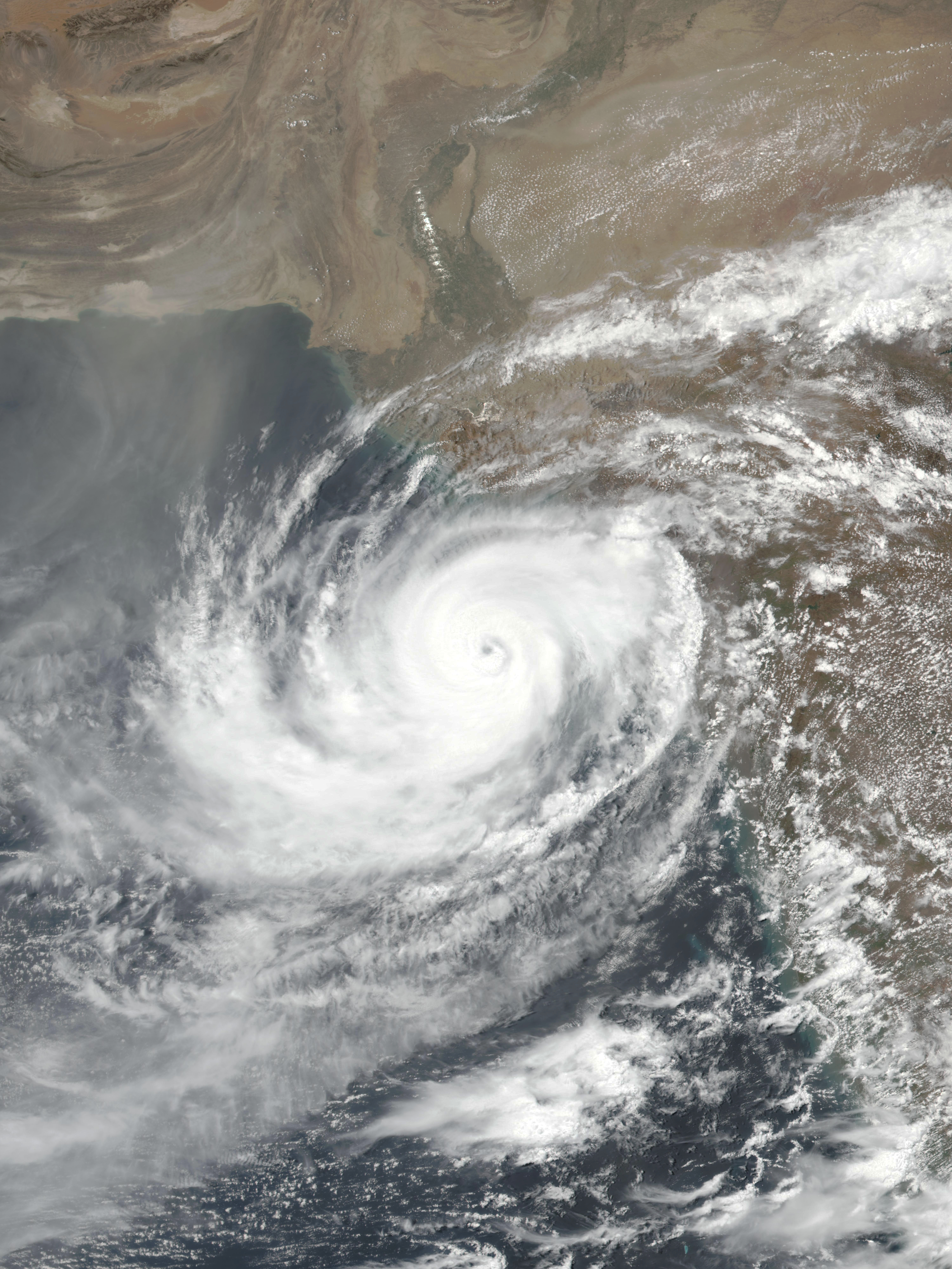
- Vayu at peak intensity on 13 June, just off the coast of Gujarat's Saurashtra Peninsula

Meteorological history
- Formed: 10 June 2019
- Remnant low: 17 June 2019
- Dissipated: 18 June 2019

Very severe cyclonic storm
- 3-minute sustained (IMD)
- Highest winds: 150 km/h (90 mph)
- Lowest pressure: 970 hPa (mbar); 28.64 inHg

Category 3-equivalent tropical cyclone
- 1-minute sustained (SSHWS/JTWC)
- Highest winds: 185 km/h (115 mph)
- Lowest pressure: 948 hPa (mbar); 27.99 inHg

Overall effects
- Fatalities: 8 total
- Damage: $140,000 (2019 USD)
- Areas affected: Maldives, India, Pakistan, Oman
- IBTrACS
- Part of the 2019 North Indian Ocean cyclone season

Very Severe Cyclonic Storm Vayu (Note: The name Vayu (Hindi: वायु, [ʋäːjuː]) was contributed by India and means "wind, air" in Hindi.) was a strong tropical cyclone that caused moderate damage in India during June 2019. It was the strongest tropical cyclone to affect the Saurashtra Peninsula of northwestern India since the 1998 Gujarat cyclone. Vayu was the third tropical depression, third cyclonic storm and second very severe cyclonic storm of the 2019 North Indian Ocean cyclone season, and the first of which to form in the Arabian Sea. Vayu originated from a low-pressure area that was first noted by the India Meteorological Department (IMD) on 9 June, near the northern Maldives. After consolidating into a depression, the storm tracked slowly north-northwestward over the eastern Arabian Sea, and reached cyclonic storm intensity late on 10 June. Steady strengthening continued into 11 June, and the storm underwent rapid intensification late in the day. Vayu reached peak intensity as a high-end very severe cyclonic storm at 06:00 UTC on 12 June, with three-minute sustained winds of 150 km/h (95 mph) and a minimum pressure of 970 hPa (28.64 inHg). Despite initially being forecast to make landfall in the state of Gujarat, Vayu turned abruptly to the west on 13 June and moved away from the coast. The system weakened gradually as it tracked slowly towards the Arabian Peninsula, then weakened more quickly after beginning to accelerate back towards India on 16 June. Vayu was downgraded to a deep depression the following morning, and further to a depression a few hours later. The system degenerated into a well-marked low-pressure area late on 17 June, just before crossing the Gujarat coast. Vayu's remnants continued inland for several more hours, before dissipating on 18 June.

In total, as many as 6.6 million people in northwestern India were impacted by the cyclone. Approximately 300,000 residents of coastal Gujarat were evacuated on 12 June in preparation for the system's arrival, and thousands of personnel were deployed to the region to assist with preparations, rescue operations and clean up efforts. As of 18 June, eight people are reported to have been killed either directly or indirectly by the cyclone, and at least 12 more injured.

== Meteorological history ==
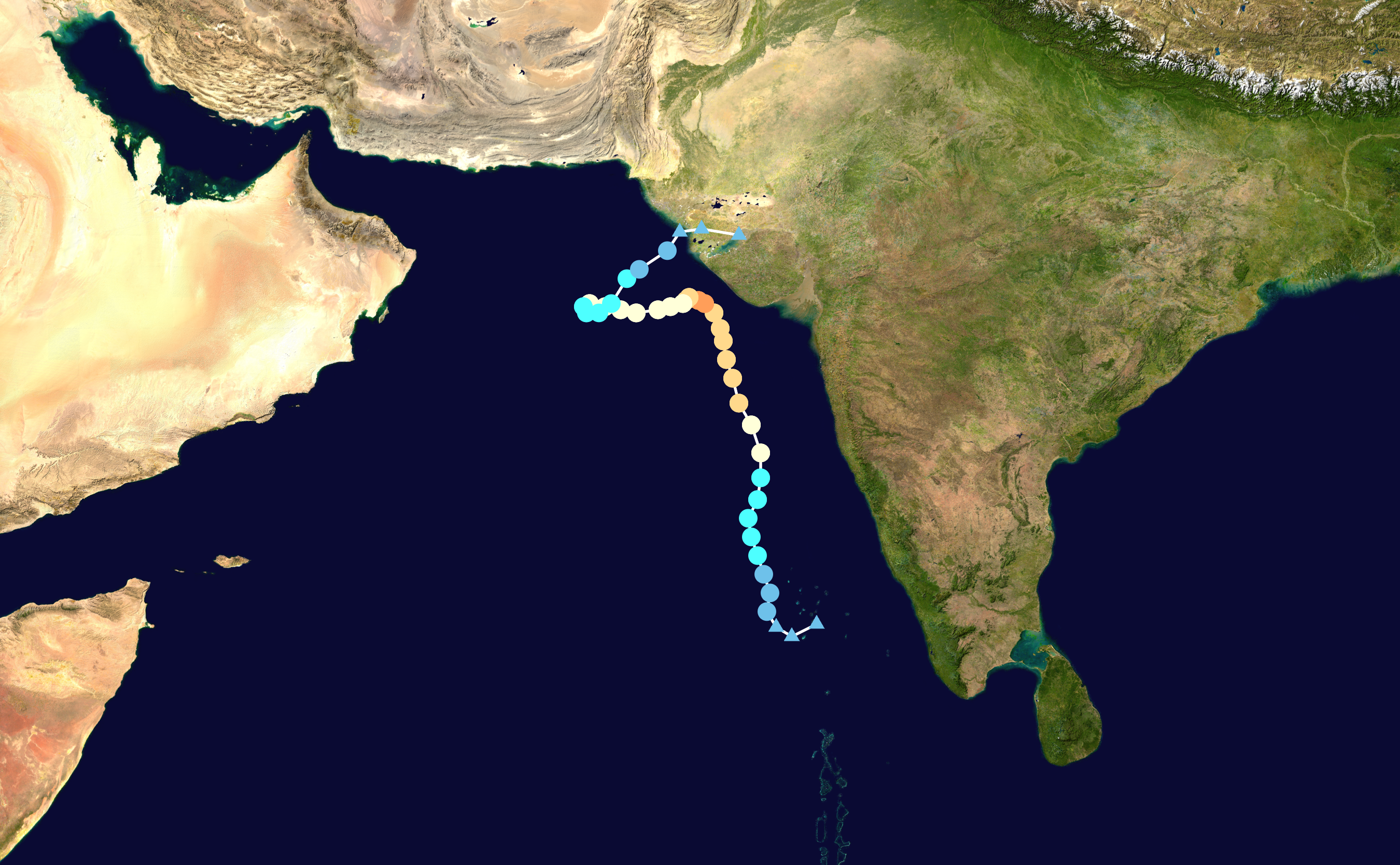
Map plotting the storm's track and intensity, according to the Saffir–Simpson scale Map key Saffir–Simpson scale Tropical depression (≤38 mph, ≤62 km/h) Tropical storm (39–73 mph, 63–118 km/h) Category 1 (74–95 mph, 119–153 km/h) Category 2 (96–110 mph, 154–177 km/h) Category 3 (111–129 mph, 178–208 km/h) Category 4 (130–156 mph, 209–251 km/h) Category 5 (≥157 mph, ≥252 km/h) Unknown Storm type Tropical cyclone Subtropical cyclone Extratropical cyclone, remnant low, tropical disturbance, or monsoon depression

In early June, a strong pulse of the Madden–Julian oscillation (MJO) tracked eastwards into the tropical Indian Ocean, leading to increased cloudiness and rainfall across the region. The presence of the pulse also contributed to enhanced convective activity, and generated conditions which were supportive of tropical cyclogenesis. On 9 June, the India Meteorological Department (IMD) noted the development of a low-pressure area over the southeastern Arabian Sea, to the north of the Maldives. Organisation increased throughout the day, and owing to the improved structure of the system, the United States' Joint Typhoon Warning Center (JTWC) issued a Tropical Cyclone Formation Alert at 22:30 UTC. At 00:00 UTC the following day, the IMD indicated that the low-pressure area had consolidated into a tropical depression, and assigned it the designation ARB 01. Conditions were favourable for further intensification, with improving upper-level divergence, and ample energy being provided by extremely warm sea surface temperatures of 31 °C (88 °F). Vertical wind shear also continued to decrease as the depression tracked steadily north-northwestwards parallel to the western coast of India under the influence of an anticyclone over central India. Deep convection strengthened around the low-level circulation centre, and the system was upgraded to a deep depression at 06:00 UTC. Six hours later, the JTWC assessed one-minute sustained winds as having reached 65 km/h (40 mph), and designated the system as Tropical Cyclone 02A. At 18:00 UTC on 10 June, the system strengthened into the third cyclonic storm of the season, and was named Vayu by the IMD.

Vayu continued to steadily strengthen after intensifying into a cyclonic storm. A formative eye began to develop on 11 June, as intense deep convection wrapped tightly around the system. Vayu became a severe cyclonic storm by 12:00 UTC, and reached Category 1 tropical cyclone status on the Saffir–Simpson hurricane wind scale (SSHWS). Shortly afterwards, the cyclone began a period of rapid intensification; however, the rate of intensification was tempered somewhat by strong vertical wind shear. Vayu was upgraded to a very severe cyclonic storm at 18:00 UTC, and continued to strengthen through 00:00 UTC on 12 June, at which point the system became a Category 2-equivalent tropical cyclone on the SSHWS. One-minute sustained winds increased to 165 km/h (105 mph) six hours later as a ragged eye developed on visible-light satellite imagery, surrounded by strong deep convection, particularly in the western semicircle of the storm. The intensification trend then slowed, however, with three-minute sustained winds only increasing further to 150 km/h (95 mph) by 12:00 UTC. Vayu's intensity soon plateaued as ocean heat content began to decrease and drier air began to infiltrate the cyclone's circulation. As Vayu approached the coastline of the state of Gujarat in northwestern India, the influence of a strengthening subtropical ridge over Saudi Arabia caused the system to gradually slow down and turn towards the west. At 12:00 UTC on 13 June, the JTWC indicated that lower vertical wind shear had allowed Vayu to strengthen, noting that the eye had become more distinct. Vayu's intensity was now equivalent to a minimal Category 3 major hurricane on the SSHWS, with one-minute sustained winds of 185 km/h (115 mph).

Vayu began to weaken on 14 June as it tracked slowly westward, away from the Gujarat coastline. Despite the low wind shear and warm ocean, upper-level outflow from the storm had begun to diminish, allowing the dry air entrainment from the northwest to start eroding the cyclone. The central dense overcast and circulation centre became increasingly ragged and elongated as deep convection diminished and started to become displaced. Vayu weakened to Category 1-equivalent tropical cyclone status at 12:00 UTC, as the loose central convection expanded to leave a ragged eye 55 km (35 mi) in diameter. Vayu's slow westward track through the weak competing steering environment over the northern Arabian Sea brought the system into an environment of high easterly vertical wind shear. The majority of deep convection became confined to the cyclone's southern quadrants, causing the system to weaken to a severe cyclonic storm at 00:00 UTC on 16 June. An approaching mid-latitude trough weakened the areas of high pressure centred to the west and northeast, Vayu recurved sharply to the northeast. Upon weakening further to a cyclonic storm, strong low-level southwesterly flow caused the system to accelerate northeastwards through the break in the blocking high-pressure ridge, back towards the Gujarat coast. Strong vertical wind shear and dry air ingestion from the western semicircle of the storm's circulation continued to erode the cyclone, and Vayu weakened into a deep depression at 03:00 UTC on 17 June, with the JTWC issuing their final advisory at this time. The system was downgraded further to a depression by the IMD six hours later. Soon afterwards, the IMD issued their final advisory on the system after Vayu degenerated into a well-marked low-pressure area, just before crossing the Gujarat coast near the India–Pakistan border. On 18 June, Vayu's remnants slowly moved inland, while continuing to weaken, before dissipating later that day.

== Preparations ==
=== First approach to land ===
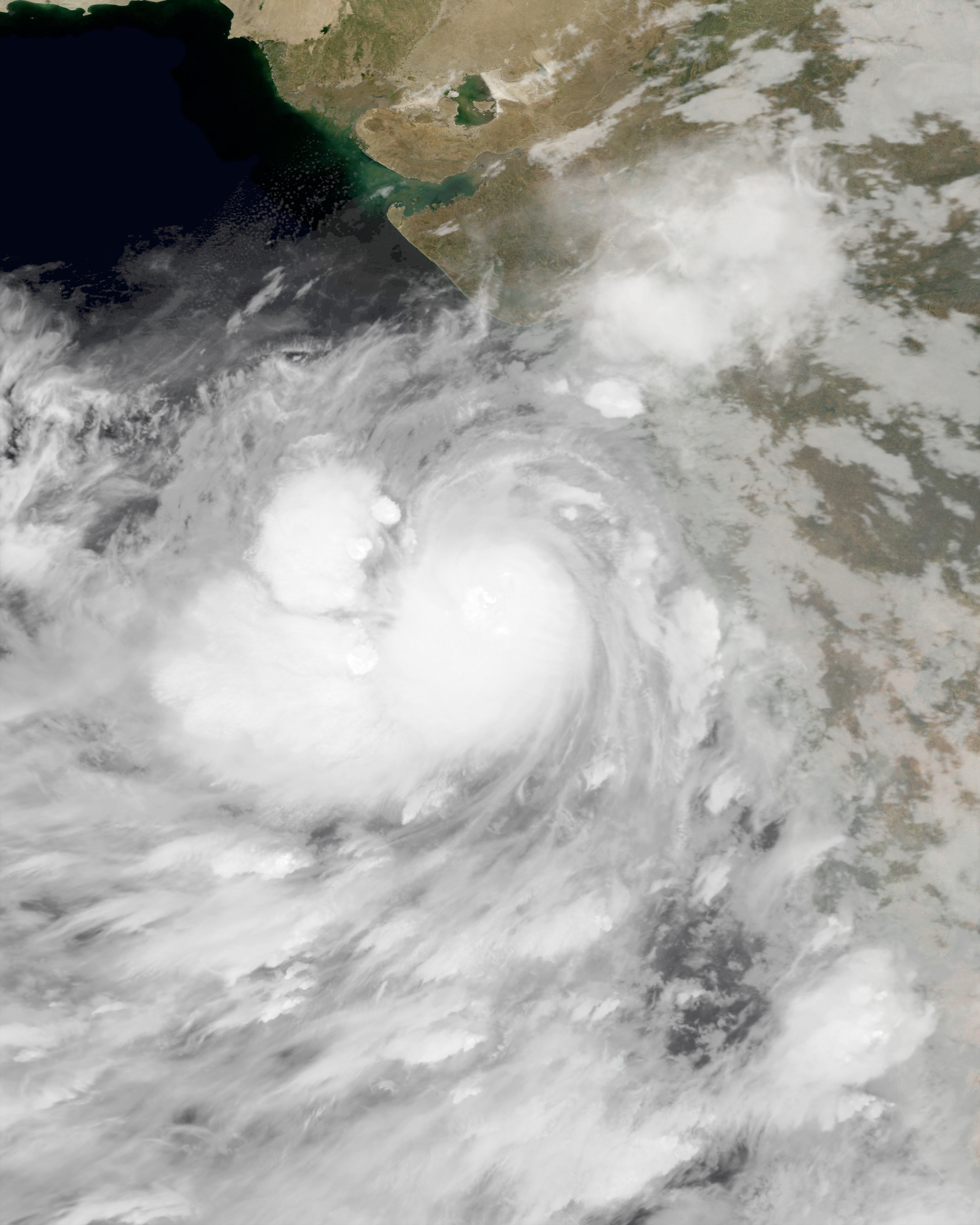
Very Severe Cyclonic Storm Vayu during its first approach

As the system intensified into a deep depression, the IMD issued a pre-cyclone watch for the coastline of the state of Gujarat. The agency indicated that further strengthening into a cyclonic storm within the following 24 hours was very likely. Fishermen were warned not to venture into the Arabian Sea near the developing system or in the forecast path of the cyclone, and mariners already at sea were urged to return to the coast. The pre-watch for the Gujarat coastline was upgraded to a yellow cyclone alert at 12:00 UTC on 10 June, with forecasts predicting landfall as a very severe cyclonic storm on 12 June. This was further upgraded to an orange alert on 11 June. The IMD warned that thatched houses in the path of the cyclone were likely to be completely destroyed, and that kutcha houses could sustain significant damage. The IMD also indicated that a storm surge of 1.5–2.0 m (4.9–6.6 ft) was possible, and had the potential to inundate low-lying coastal areas.

Tropical cyclones are relatively infrequent in northwestern India and the northern Arabian Sea. Gujarat had not experienced a hurricane-force tropical cyclone landfall since an unnamed system struck the region as an extremely severe cyclonic storm in June 1998, causing more than 10,000 fatalities. As Vayu was initially forecast to make landfall as a very severe cyclonic storm, the potential for major impacts prompted significant preparation measures in the state. Beginning on the morning of 12 June, the Indian government evacuated approximately 300,000 people living in coastal regions of Gujarat to 2000 shelter homes, as well as 10,000 people from the nearby island of Diu. All schools and colleges in the area were also closed to safeguard students and staff. All flights at airports in Porbandar, Diu, Bhavnagar, Keshod and Kandla were grounded from midnight local time on 13 June, and 77 train services cancelled and 38 others shortened. In Mumbai, ferry services were suspended, more than 128 train services were cancelled or shortened, and approximately 400 flights were affected by delays or diversions as the cyclone passed to the west on 12–13 June. All ports in Gujarat suspended operations from 12 June, and many vessels which had been berthed there departed the ports for safety.

Approximately 2,300 personnel in 52 teams from the National Disaster Response Force were deployed to Gujarat help local authorities with evacuation efforts, as well as to aid in search, rescue and relief operations after the cyclone. Personnel from the state reserve police were deployed to the region, as well as 300 commandos from the state marine police. Boats and aircraft were sent to various locations across Gujarat to enable and assist search and rescue operations if required. The Indian Coast Guard, Army, Navy and Air Force were also all put on alert, with about 2,400 army personnel in 34 teams placed on standby, and naval diving teams assembled to conduct water rescues if necessary. Police officers also conducted night patrols to ensure that no residents were left behind in evacuated areas.

=== Second approach to land ===
After local governments were informed that Cyclone Vayu was likely to return to the coast of Gujarat, further preparations were undertaken, albeit minor due to the significantly weakened nature of the system. The IMD warned that heavy rainfall and large waves were expected, and had the potential to inundate low-lying areas such as the coastal salt marshes. As a precaution, the local government in the Kutch district of northern Gujarat asked salt pan workers in coastal areas from Bhachau to Mundra to stay home from work. The government noted that five teams from the NDRF that had been deployed in the initial large-scale preparatory measures would remain in Kutch for the anticipated landfall, and that several teams of local officers had been formed to help maintain safety and security throughout the event. Plans were made to evacuate local residents at short notice if required.

== Impacts ==
Despite not making landfall, Cyclone Vayu tracked close enough to the Indian coastline to produce minor impacts. Strong winds, heavy rainfall and large waves were experienced along large sections of the country's western coast, particularly in Gujarat. Numerous thatched houses were either damaged or destroyed by gusty winds, with many kutcha houses having their roofs torn off. A large number of tin sheds were blown away, and many trees were uprooted along the Saurashtra coast and on the island of Diu. Strong winds caused the 150-year-old Bhuteshwar Mahadev temple in Porbandar to collapse and a metal shed at Somnath Temple to be damaged. Damage to power lines and electricity poles caused power cuts in more than 2,250 villages in Gujarat, with blackouts lasting for several days in some locations. The prolonged strong winds generated waves of around 4 m (13 ft) high along large parts of the coastline. Many low-lying coastal areas on the Saurashtra coast and southern Gujarat were flooded by waves and tides of up to 6 m (20 ft) in height, and severe damage was caused to at least 15 houses in the city of Ullal. Local fishermen in Porbandar sustained ₹10 million (US$140,000) in damages as strong winds and waves caused as many as 25 small boats to sink, and one larger boat to receive significant damage. In Veraval, about 20 small boats and five larger boats were also damaged. Fishermen complained that there had been inadequate room to safely anchor their vessels during the cyclone, which was responsible for the damage. Some fishermen in Veraval also had to be rescued after their boats capsized in the large waves, with one person being hospitalised due to their injuries.

Rain in Mehsana city of Gujarat on 18 June 2019 due to impact of Cyclone Vayu

Moderate to heavy rainfall occurred in more than 100 tehsils across Gujarat. The highest observed rainfall total was at Talala in the Gir-Somnath district, where 160 millimetres (6.3 in) of precipitation was recorded. Veraval also experienced heavy rainfall, with 67 millimetres (2.6 in) falling in just six hours. In southern Gujarat, lightning strikes killed five people and injured two others. Many of the victims had been working on farms during heavy rain and thunderstorms when they were struck. A motorist was also killed after being hit by a falling tree on the side of the road while driving home. In the town of Chamba in northern India, houses and roads were damaged by flash flooding and hail from a severe thunderstorm associated with Vayu. Rainfall associated with Vayu continued for several days in the state of Maharashtra, with the city of Nashik receiving 92.1 millimetre (0.039 in) of precipitation in a 24-hour period on 15–16 June.

Cyclone Vayu also caused impacts in other parts of India. Mumbai experienced strong sustained winds which peaked just below gale-force at 58 km/h (36 mph) after midday on 12 June. Several trees fell throughout the city, resulting in at least four injuries, and blocking a road for many hours. A pedestrian was killed and two others were injured when an aluminium cladding sheet fell from Churchgate railway station. The family of the deceased victim received ₹500,000 (US$7,000) as an ex gratia payment from the railway company. Three pedestrians were injured by an acrylic sheet that had fallen from a skywalk due to strong winds. A hoarding also collapsed near a train station in Thane, although no injuries were reported. Strong winds also produced a large dust storm in the Indian capital, New Delhi, on 12 June. Crude oil and plastic waste were washed up onto beaches on the Raigad, Ratnagiri and Sindhudurg coasts by waves generated by Vayu.

Enhanced waves and ocean swell generated by Cyclone Vayu while it was located in the northern Arabian Sea also affected some coastal areas of Oman, including the South Al Sharqiyah governorate. The waves caused minor flooding of low-lying areas in various towns along the coast, including Al Suwaih and Ras Al Hid. Seawater caused some houses to become flooded, as well as local beaches and surrounding areas. Floodwaters also caused several vehicles to drift from where they were parked. Large waves also caused minor flooding in about ten villages in coastal regions of southern Pakistan.

The onset of the Indian monsoon had been delayed past its usual commencement by about one week due to near-El Niño conditions in the tropical Pacific Ocean throughout 2019. The formation of Cyclone Vayu caused a further week's delay in the monsoon's progression towards northern India by drawing clouds and moisture over the Arabian Sea, away from the developing monsoon trough. The severe heat wave in Pakistan was also exacerbated by Vayu. The anticlockwise rotation of the cyclone's wind field caused typical cool onshore winds to be replaced by hot winds from the desert to the north. Temperatures of above 40 °C (104 °F) were experienced in numerous cities across the country, including the coastal city of Karachi. One elderly resident in Karachi died of heat stroke on 15 June, and numerous other people were treated in hospitals and medical clinics for symptoms such as dehydration, dizziness and exhaustion.

== See also ==
- 1998 Gujarat cyclone—an extremely deadly and damaging tropical cyclone to make landfall in Gujarat
- 2001 India cyclone—a powerful tropical cyclone which followed a similar track to Vayu
- Cyclone Gonu—the most powerful tropical cyclone on record in the Arabian Sea, occurring in June 2007
- 2015 Gujarat cyclone—a weak but deadly and damaging tropical cyclone that made landfall in Gujarat as a deep depression
- Cyclone Ockhi—a strong tropical cyclone in the Arabian Sea in December 2017 which also affected western India
- Cyclone Maha—a strong tropical cyclone that took a similar path later in the season
- Cyclone Tauktae—an extremely damaging tropical cyclone, and the most recent to make landfall in Gujarat
- Cyclone Biparjoy—a damaging cyclone in 2023, also with a similar path
