= SS Vaitarna =

Steamship that disappeared in 1888

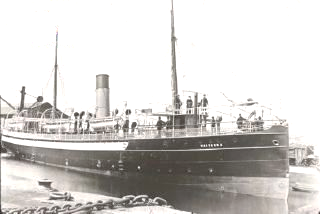
- SS Vaitarna in Grangemouth Docks, 1885

History
- Name: Vaitarna
- Owner: A J Shepherd & Co, Bombay
- Operator: Bombay Steamer Navigation Company
- Port of registry: Glasgow
- Route: Mandvi – Bombay
- Builder: Grangemouth Dockyard Co. Ltd.
- Yard number: 86
- Laid down: 1882
- Launched: 27 June 1885
- Identification: Official Number 90062
- Nickname(s): Vijli
- Fate: Missing after 8 November 1888 and presumed sunk

General characteristics
- Type: Cargo/Passenger ship
- Tonnage: 292 GRT, 63 NRT, 258 under deck
- Length: 170.1 ft (51.85 m)
- Beam: 26.5 ft (8.08 m)
- Depth: 9.9 ft (3.02 m)
- Installed power: 73 hp
- Propulsion: Steam propulsion
- Speed: 13 knots
- Notes: as per Lloyd's Register of Shipping

SS Vaitarna, popularly known as Vijli or Haji Kasam ni Vijli, and the Titanic of Gujarat, was a steamship owned by A J Shepherd & Co, Bombay that disappeared on 8 November 1888 off the coast of Kathiawar (now Saurashtra region of Gujarat) in the 1888 Arabian Sea cyclone during a crossing from Mandvi to Bombay. More than 740 people on board went missing in the disaster. The incident resulted in the creation of nautical lore and songs.

== Etymology ==
Named Vaitarna after Vaitarna river of Bombay Presidency, the ship was nicknamed Vijli, literally electricity, as it was lit with electric bulbs. The ship is often dubbed the "Titanic of Gujarat" even though RMS Titanic sank 24 years later.

== Design ==
SS Vaitarna was the first steamship built by Grangemouth Dockyard Co. Ltd., Grangemouth and launched in 1885. She was a schooner made of steel and took three years to complete. This screw steamer had three floors and twenty five cabins. She had a single funnel, two masts and a fore-and-aft rigged sail furled against the forward mast. Her register tonnage were 292 GRT, 63 NRT, and 258 under deck. Her compound steam engines had two cylinders with 21" diameter and had stroke of 42" and 30" generating 73 Horsepower. These engines were built by Dunsmuir & Jackson, Glasgow. She was owned by A J Shepherd & Co, Bombay and was registered in Glasgow. She was 170.1 feet long, 26.5 feet broad and 9.9 feet deep. It was brought to Karachi by traveling around Africa for a maiden trip to Bombay.

== Career and disappearance ==
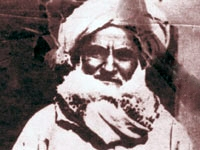
Haji Kasam, Captain of SS Vaitarna

She traded between Mandvi, Kutch State and Bombay ferrying passengers and goods. She took 30 hours to travel from Mandvi to Bombay at a fare of ₹8. The ships of the region were not designed to mitigate storms as they generally travelled along the coast from port to port during calm seasons and were laid up in harbor during stormy monsoon sea.

SS Vaitarna was anchored on Mandvi port on 8 November 1888, Thursday (Vikram Samvat 1945 Kartik Sud Pancham), at noon and she left for Dwarka after taking 520 passengers on board. She reached Dwarka and had some more passengers on board, reaching 703 in number. She left for Porbandar. Though according to lores, Porbandar port administrator Lelie told the Captain not to venture into the sea, but later research did not support the claim. Due to bad weather she did not stop at Porbandar and directly headed for Bombay. In the evening, she was seen off the coast of Mangrol, and later at night some people claimed that she was seen wrecking near Madhavpur (Ghed) amid severe storm (1888 Arabian Sea cyclone). The next day she was declared missing.

=== Casualties ===
No bodies or debris of the ship was found. She was assumed to be wrecked in a cyclonic storm in the Arabian Sea. Though the folklores states casualty of 1300 people, there were 746 people (703 passengers and 43 crew members) on board who went missing in the disaster. The other numbers reported are 798, 741 (38 crew member and 703 passengers) and 744. There were thirteen wedding parties on board and several students headed for Bombay to appear in the matriculation examination of Bombay University in December.

Kasam Ibrahim or Haji Kasam was the captain of the ship. He was an aristocrat from Kutch holding tracts of land between Borivali and Dahisar in Bombay. He had his office at Abdul Rehman Street and lived at Malabar Hill. According to folklore, it is believed that he was blessed by a Fakir that he will own 99 ships and Vijli was his last. Haji Kasam Chawl in Bombay Central is named after him.

== Inquiry ==
Following the disappearance of the ship, the Bombay Presidency formed a committee, Marine Court of Inquiry, to probe the matter. It pointed out that Vaitarna was ill-equipped with safety measures. It did not have enough lifeboats and life jackets aboard. She was overwhelmed by the heavy storm. The aneroids used on board the other steamers of the line of the ships to which Vaitarna belonged were checked and found inaccurate. The Bombay Presidency government and some shipping companies sent steamers to search for the shipwreck but were unsuccessful.

== Cultural influence ==
The incident resulted in formation of many nautical lores, myths, legends and songs over the years and became popular in folklore of Gujarat. The ship was popularly referred to as Vijli in folklore and is chiefly associated with its captain Kasam Ibrahim. There was also Haji Kasam Noor Mohammed, a booking agent of Shepherd at Porbandar.

After the disappearance of the ship, a poet from Jamnagar, Durlabhrai V. Shyamji Dhruv published a collection of songs titled Vijli Vilap. Bhikharam Savji Joshi also published another collection in the same name. Jhaverchand Meghani collected and published one of such songs in his folksong collection, Radhiyali Raat, titled "Haji Kasam, Tari Vijli Re Madhdariye Veran Thai" (Gujarati: "હાજી કાસમ, તારી વીજળી રે મધદરિયે વેરણ થઈ"). Gujarati author Gunvantrai Acharya wrote a fiction titled, Haji Kasam Tari Vijli (1954) based on the incident.

Y. M. Chitalwala, a researcher based in Dhoraji researched the incident and documented it in Vijli Haji Kasamni published by Darshak Itihas Nidhi in 2010.

In the preface of Twin Tales from Kutcch: A family saga set in Colonial India, Saeed Ibrahim has mentioned that he lost his grandparents in the event.

A film based on the incident, Vijli: Mystery of the Phantom Ship, directed by Dhwanil Mehta and starring Rana Daggubati, was announced in 2017 with story written by Yogesh Joshi. No further updates were provided.
