= 2021 hurricane season =

The 2021 hurricane season may refer to:

- 2021 Atlantic hurricane season
- 2021 Pacific hurricane season
- 2021 Pacific typhoon season
- 2021 North Indian Ocean cyclone season
- 2021–22 South-West Indian Ocean cyclone season
- 2021–22 Australian region cyclone season
- 2021–22 South Pacific cyclone season
- Tropical cyclones in 2021
