= Cyclone Jawad =

North Indian Ocean cyclone in 2021

Cyclonic Storm Jawad
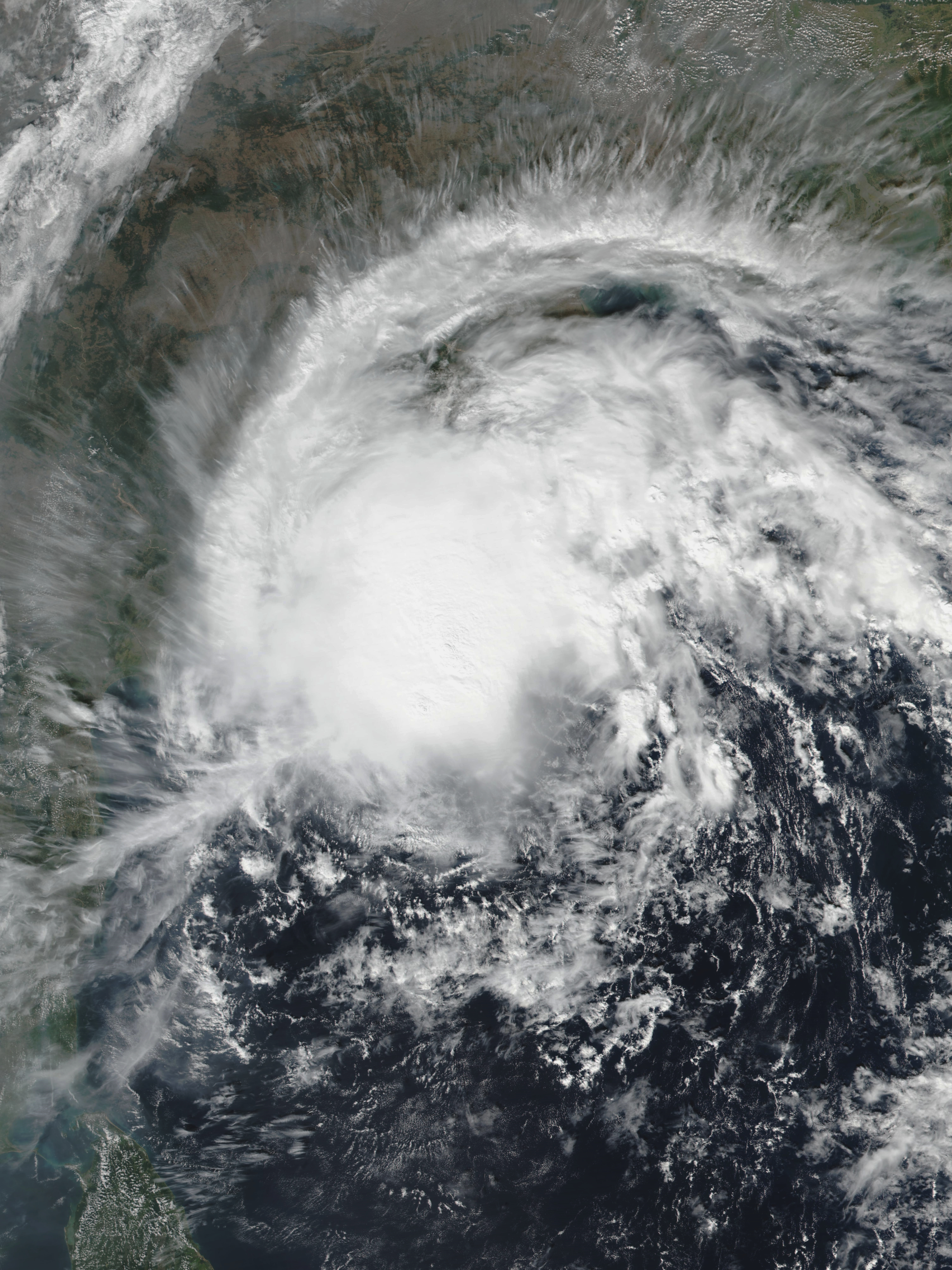
- Cyclonic Storm Jawad before making landfall in India on 3 December

Meteorological history
- Formed: 2 December 2021
- Dissipated: 5 December 2021

Cyclonic storm
- 3-minute sustained (IMD)
- Highest winds: 75 km/h (45 mph)
- Lowest pressure: 1000 hPa (mbar); 29.53 inHg

Tropical storm
- 1-minute sustained (SSHWS/JTWC)
- Highest winds: 65 km/h (40 mph)
- Lowest pressure: 1000 hPa (mbar); 29.53 inHg

Overall effects
- Fatalities: 2 total
- Damage: $50.4 million (2021 USD)
- Areas affected: Bangladesh, India (Andhra Pradesh, Odisha, West Bengal)
- IBTrACS
- Part of the 2021 North Indian Ocean cyclone season

Cyclonic Storm Jawad (Note: The name Jawad (Arabic: جواد, [d͡ʒawaːd]) was contributed by Saudi Arabia and is a masculine given name meaning "generous" in Arabic.) was a relatively weak tropical cyclone whose remnants brought heavy rainfall over East India and Bangladesh. The tenth depression, sixth deep depression and fifth cyclonic storm of the active 2021 North Indian Ocean cyclone season, its predecessor was first tracked by Joint Typhoon Warning Center (JTWC) in the South China Sea as an area of low pressure. It then moved west-northwestwards into the Gulf of Thailand, where it crossed into the Andaman Sea by 1 December. Near midnight of that day, the JTWC issued a TCFA on the system and on the next day, the India Meteorological Department (IMD) upgraded the system to a depression after passing through the Nicobar Islands. Further intensification ensued as the depression tracked through environmental conditions favorable for strengthening, and the system was upgraded into a deep depression on 3 December and into a cyclonic storm by 06:00 UTC that day, with the IMD naming it Jawad. However, this intensification was short-lived, as the system weakened to a deep depression back due to wind shear.

Widespread preparations were conducted due to Jawad. School and train operations were disrupted and canceled, and disaster teams were deployed in Andhra Pradesh and Odisha for the storm. Individuals living in coastal areas were evacuated, including over 54,000 people in the former state. Essential stocks were also prepared for possible emergencies, as well as disaster relief. Two fatalities associated with the system were confirmed, both in Srikakulam. Both teenagers were crushed to their deaths by falling coconut trees.

== Meteorological history ==
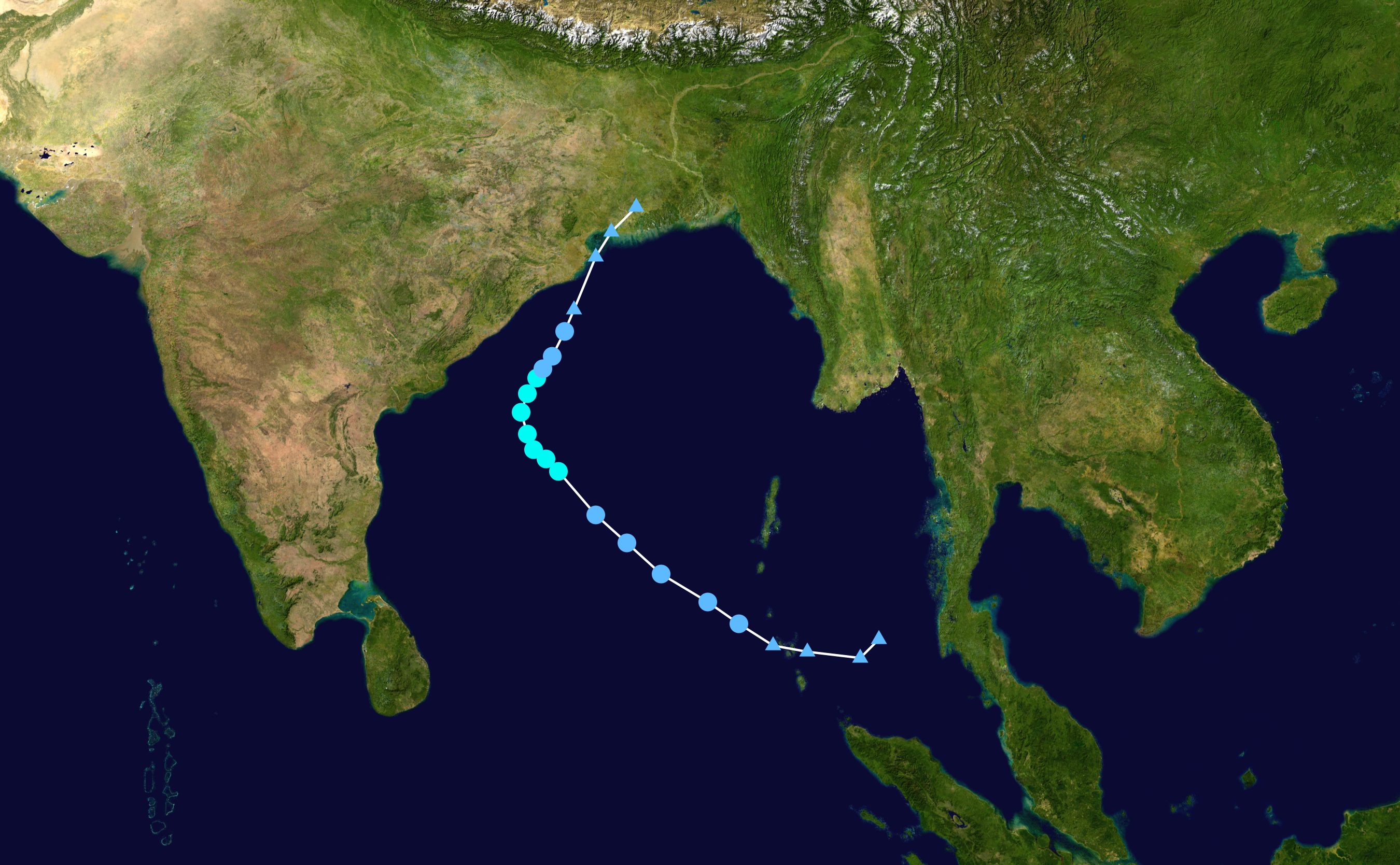
Map plotting the storm's track and intensity, according to the Saffir–Simpson scale Map key Saffir–Simpson scale Tropical depression (≤38 mph, ≤62 km/h) Tropical storm (39–73 mph, 63–118 km/h) Category 1 (74–95 mph, 119–153 km/h) Category 2 (96–110 mph, 154–177 km/h) Category 3 (111–129 mph, 178–208 km/h) Category 4 (130–156 mph, 209–251 km/h) Category 5 (≥157 mph, ≥252 km/h) Unknown Storm type Tropical cyclone Subtropical cyclone Extratropical cyclone, remnant low, tropical disturbance, or monsoon depression

At 06:00 UTC on 30 November, the JTWC started to monitor an area of convection in their weather advisory at that time, with them designating this system as "Invest 94W" over the South China Sea halfway between the island of Borneo and Vietnam, located about 251 nmi (465 km; 289 mi) to Ho Chi Minh City's south-southeast. Twelve hours later, the JMA would note this system as a west-northwestward moving low-pressure area. It then moved over the Andaman Sea from the Gulf of Thailand. Located about 131 nautical miles (243 km; 151 mi) to the north-northwest of Phuket Island in Thailand, the agency analysed a low-level circulation along with its sprawling convection, while taking a west-northwestward track across the Andaman and Nicobar Islands. They also evaluated the environment around the storm as "favorable", with strong outflow, 29–30 °C (84–86 °F) sea surface temperatures and moderate wind shear. Meanwhile, the IMD had already started to monitor this low-pressure area earlier at 03:00 UTC (8:30 IST), while it was located over southern Thailand. Nevertheless, it moved over the Nicobar Islands and into the Bay of Bengal around 1 December, with the IMD also upgrading the system to a well-marked low-pressure on that day. However, moderate wind shear had displaced the system's convection to the northwest by 18:00 UTC that day. Shortly before that midnight, the JTWC issued a Tropical Cyclone Formation Alert (TCFA) on the system, as numerical guidance forecast models revealed further strengthening of the storm. On the next day, the low-pressure system turned to the northwest, before the IMD upgraded the storm into a depression, with the agency designating the storm as "BOB 07" at 12:00 UTC.

At 03:00 UTC (08:30 IST), the IMD further upgraded the system to a deep depression, as a Dvorak number of T 2.0 calculated for the system, indicating further organization. Meanwhile, the JTWC designated the system as "Tropical Cyclone 05B" at the same time, as another Dvorak fix revealed a wind speed of 35 knots (65 km/h; 40 mph). The deep depression took a west-northwestward track again, and approximately three hours later, the system strengthened into a cyclonic storm, with the IMD naming it Jawad, the fifth name from the naming lists of the annual cyclone season, which was submitted by Saudi Arabia, which means "generous" or "merciful" in Arabic. However, starting at 12:00 UTC, Jawad began to slow down, while retaining its organization. Possibly due to decreasing sea surface temperatures along the storm's track with unfavorable wind shear, Jawad lost its organization and the IMD downgraded the storm back into a deep depression by 12:00 UTC of 4 December. This same reasoning was also used by the JTWC in the agency's final warning on the system, three hours earlier. At the same time by the next day, Jawad was further downgraded into a depression as it started to make a northwestward move, and by 6 December at 00:00 UTC, the system further degenerated into a well-marked low-pressure over the northwest Bay of Bengal without making landfall; its convection moved inland over West Bengal and Bangladesh, however.

== Preparations ==
=== Andhra Pradesh and Odisha ===
The state of Odisha was forecasted to brunt the most impacts from Jawad, according to the IMD. Winds of 70 to 80 kilometres per hour (43 to 50 mph) were first seen to slash the region along with heavy rainfall. Several train operations of East Coast Railway, South Western Railway and South Eastern Railway were also canceled as a precaution of the brewing cyclone. As the precursor of the cyclone developed into a depression, orange and red rainfall alert was placed for the coastal areas of northern Andhra Pradesh and Odisha, respectively.

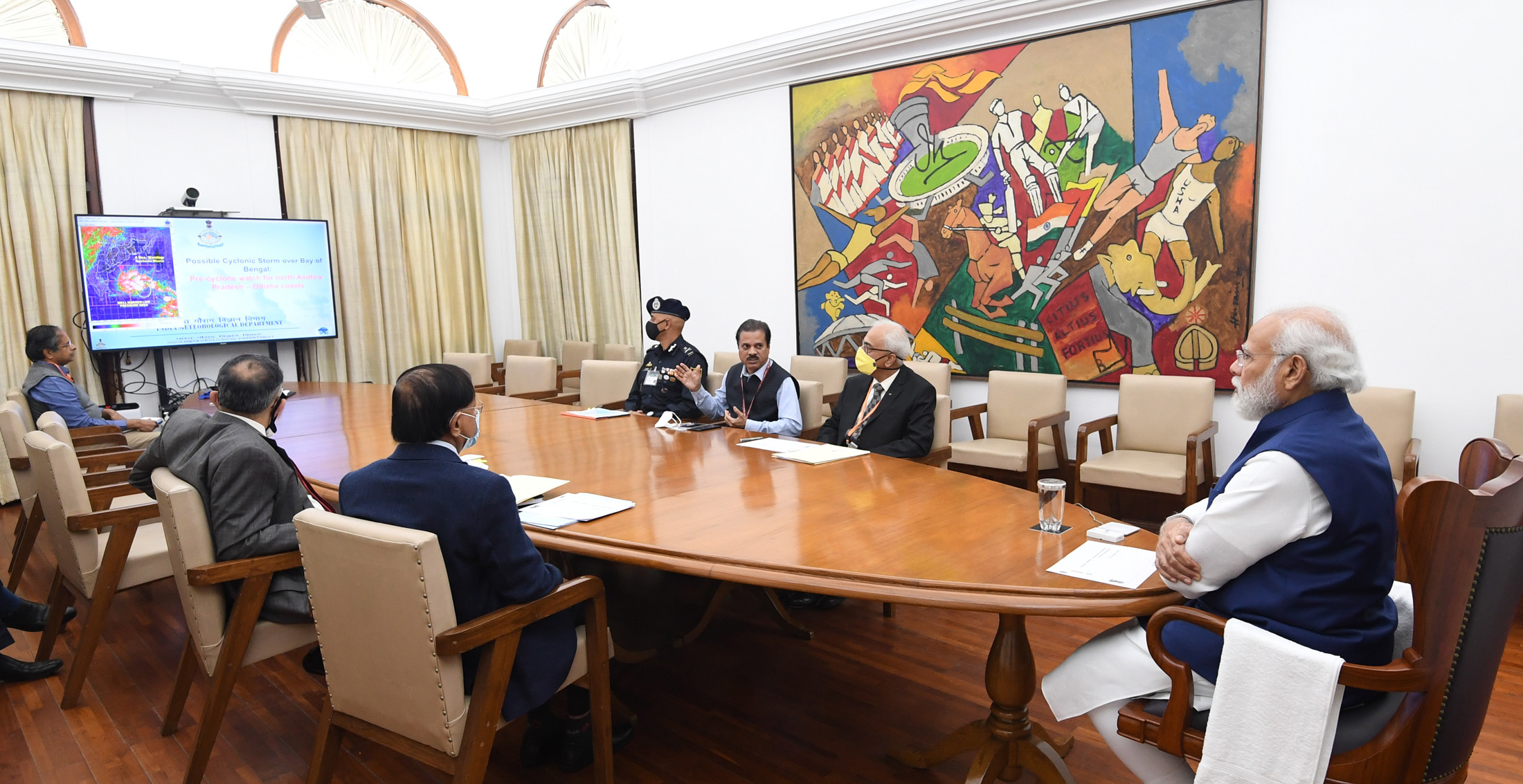
Prime Minister, Shri Narendra Modi chairing the high-level meeting to review preparedness to deal with Cyclone Jawad, in New Delhi on 2 December, 2021.

On 2 December 2021, Narendra Modi, the Prime Minister of India, presided a meeting to discuss the potential consequences and readiness of the states that Jawad may hit. There, he instructed the administration of these states to evacuate individuals "in time" and to make the essential services during the cyclone stable, along with disaster relief people. Residents in 13 districts of Odisha were also requested to evacuate while teams of National Disaster Response Force were positioned across the state that are seen to be impacted by the cyclone. Food, drinking water and essential supply stocks were also readied. School operations in Visakhapatnam and Srikakulam in Andhra Pradesh were halted while the Konark Festival and International Sand Art Festival, due to occur on 1 December were both canceled in Odisha. The residents living over Bhadrak's coastal areas in the latter were already evacuated while over 54,008 individuals at the former state were sheltered to safety in evacuation centers set up by the state administration.

=== West Bengal ===
A 24-hour control center was set up by the Government of West Bengal in preparation for the storm. Fishermen located over the Bay of Bengal and farmers and tourists inland West Bengal were also alerted for heavy rains and strong winds. Command rooms were set up in preparation for the storm in the aforementioned state. Over 11,000 individuals were seen to be evacuated from Jawad, along with more people living near the shores to the safety shelters set up by the state government. Disaster teams were deployed in West Bengal, while the Indian Coast Guard warned many vessels to return to ports. Tourists in Digha, Mandarmani, and Tajpur were also forced to cancel their bookings and reservations in the beach town due to the warnings imposed by the state. The NDRF teams situated in the state were also informing people about the possible effects of Jawad. In addition, tree branches were being cut, 188 evacuation shelters were set up, and a power system was checked. The various parts of Kolkata such as Dum Dum and Bidhannagar were also readied for the cyclone's possible effects. Due to a possible storm surge being expected from the storm, over 20,000 individuals from Kakdwip, South 24 Parganas were sheltered in safe places, away from the coastline. Ferry services were also canceled.

== Impacts ==
=== Andhra Pradesh ===
The first two fatalities reported from Jawad are located at Srikakulam, first where a 17-year-old girl was killed by an uprooting coconut tree. The other was another teenager, who was killed for the same reason. Heavy rainfall was experienced in the city, along with strong winds. Coastal areas over Andhra Pradesh and Odisha also began to see rainfall by 3 December in the evening. A rainfall amount of 57.4 millimetres (2.26 in) was recorded at Kaviti Mandal in the aforementioned city, the highest associated with the storm in the state. Santhabommali collected 52.8 millimetres (2.08 in) and Sompeta at 50.2 millimetres (1.98 in). Despite these effects, only minor damages were recorded in Andhra Pradesh from Jawad as the system weakened before affecting the state.

=== Odisha ===
In Odisha, Gopalpur registered a rain amount of 40 millimetres (1.6 in) from 4 – 5 December. The highest rainfall amount from Jawad is centered at Paradeep with 201.0 millimetres (7.91 in), where rainfall disrupted port services and operations there. Erasama followed the list, with 188.0 millimetres (7.40 in) and Khallikote with 156.0 millimetres (6.14 in). The cities of Bhubaneswar and Cuttack also received rainfall from Jawad, with the former receiving 72.3 millimetres (2.85 in) from the storm. This caused several traffic disruptions and some flooding in these areas. Many paddy crops, along with other miscellaneous were also reported to have been damaged and inundated with flooding, along with farming disruptions. Damage within the state was ₹3.77 billion (US$50 million).

=== West Bengal ===
From 4 December 2021, West Bengal started to experience rainfall from Jawad, first being centered over West and East Midnapore. A fishing vessel sank while the boat was being anchored in South 24 Parganas; no casualty was reported. Kolkata registered a rainfall amount of 5.5 millimetres (0.22 in) from 4–5 December. Meanwhile, Digha received 19.7 millimetres (0.78 in) and 16.0 millimetres (0.63 in) for Midnapore at the same time. Despite these rainfall amounts, many reservoirs in the state was reported to have been rising in their water levels. Heavy rainfall was also reported in Kolkata, Howrah, Hooghly and forecasted for North 24 Parganas, South 24 Parganas, Nadia and Murshidabad.

=== Bangladesh ===
Two villages in Khulna District were flooded due to heavy rains from Jawad. In Sarankhola Upazila, the water level rose to 0.75 ft (0.23 m), lots of dried fish was washed away. Fishing grounds and fields were submerged under the floodwater, and caused a loss of about ৳30 million (US$350,000).

== See also ==
- Tropical cyclones in 2021
- Weather of 2021
- Cyclone Forrest
- Cyclone Phailin
- Typhoon Gay (1989)
- Cyclones Matmo and Bulbul
- Cyclone Yaas
