= 2021 North Indian Ocean cyclone season =

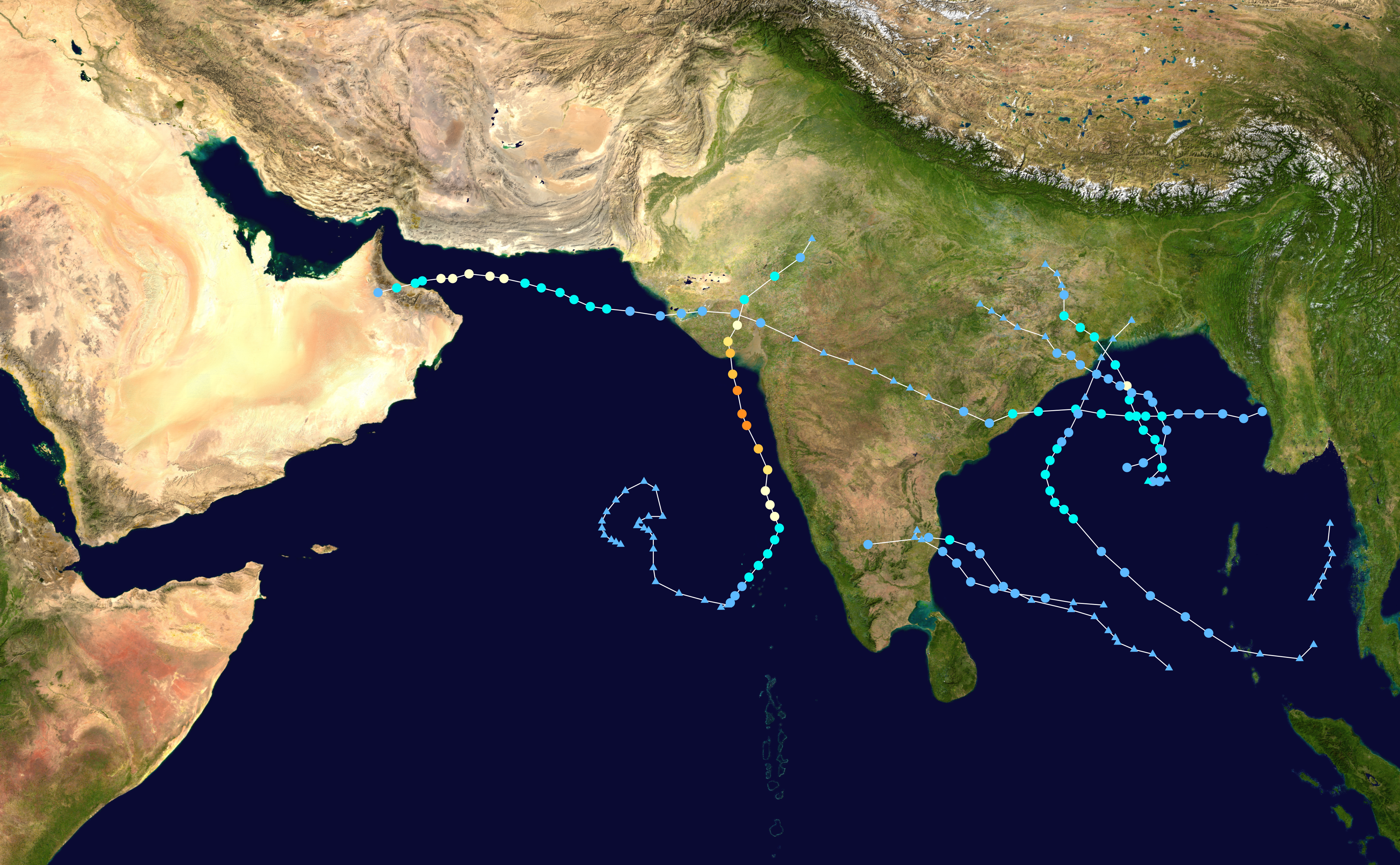
- Season summary map

Seasonal boundaries
- First system formed: April 2, 2021
- Last system dissipated: December 6, 2021

Strongest storm
- Name: Tauktae
  - Maximum winds: 185 km/h (115 mph) (3-minute sustained)
  - Lowest pressure: 950 hPa (mbar)

Seasonal statistics
- Depressions: 10
- Deep depressions: 6
- Cyclonic storms: 5
- Severe cyclonic storms: 3
- Very severe cyclonic storms: 2
- Extremely severe cyclonic storms: 1
- Total fatalities: 273 total
- Total damage: $6.1 billion (2021 USD)

Related articles
- 2021 Atlantic hurricane season; 2021 Pacific hurricane season; 2021 Pacific typhoon season

The 2021 North Indian Ocean cyclone season was an average season, the North Indian Ocean cyclone season has no official bounds, but cyclones tend to form between April and December, peaking between May and November. These dates conventionally delimit the period of each year when most tropical cyclones form in the northern Indian Ocean. The season began on April 2, when a depression designated as BOB 01 was formed in the north Andaman Sea and quickly made landfall in Myanmar. The basin remained quiet for over a month before Cyclone Tauktae formed. It rapidly intensified into an extremely severe cyclonic storm before making landfall in Gujarat, become the strongest storm ever to strike that state since the 1998 Gujarat cyclone. Later that month, BOB 02 formed and later strengthened into Cyclone Yaas. Yaas rapidly intensified into a very severe cyclonic storm before making landfall in northwestern Odisha. The season's strongest tropical cyclone was Cyclone Tauktae, with maximum wind speeds of 185 km/h (115 mph) and a minimum barometric pressure of 950 hPa (28.05 inHg).

The scope of this article is limited to the Indian Ocean in the Northern Hemisphere, east of the Horn of Africa and west of the Malay Peninsula. There are two main seas in the North Indian Ocean — the Arabian Sea to the west of the Indian subcontinent, abbreviated ARB by the India Meteorological Department (IMD); and the Bay of Bengal to the east, abbreviated BOB by the IMD. The official Regional Specialized Meteorological Centre in this basin is the India Meteorological Department (IMD), while the Joint Typhoon Warning Center releases unofficial advisories. On average, four to six cyclonic storms form in this basin every season.

== Season summary ==
No systems formed in the basin until April 2, when a depression near the Myanmar coast in the North Andaman Sea formed, however it dissipated the next day. It was considered rare since the storm formation usually begins from mid-April to May. After a month of inactivity, another depression formed off the coasts of Kerala and Lakshadweep. It intensified into a deep depression on the same day and later into a cyclonic storm, being assigned the name Tauktae by the IMD. It continued intensifying, and on May 17, Tauktae peaked as an extremely severe cyclonic storm before making landfall in Gujarat hours later, dissipating on May 19. A few days after Tauktae dissipated, a depression formed in the Bay of Bengal on May 23. It intensified gradually to a cyclonic storm and assigned the name Yaas. It further intensified into a very severe cyclonic storm on May 25 and made landfall in the state of Odisha by the next day, becoming the second cyclone to hit the nation within a span of ten days.

After a long gap of three and a half months, a depression formed in the Bay of Bengal on September 12, becoming the first system in the monsoon season. Not a week later, another depression formed over the east-central Bay of Bengal, making the second system in the post-monsoon season. It later intensified into a deep depression and on 25 September 2021, it intensified into cyclonic storm which was named Gulab, marking the first named storm in the post-monsoon season. Then, after only two days, the remnants of Cyclonic Storm Gulab entered the Arabian sea and regenerated into a Depression and became ARB 02. ARB 02 intensified into a cyclonic storm and was named Shaheen by the IMD. After an unusual month of inactivity, Depression ARB 03 formed in early November and remained out to sea. A couple of days later, Depression BOB 05 formed in the Bay of Bengal but failed to further intensify due to high wind shear. BOB 05 impacted portions of southern India with flooding, and some areas experienced cyclonic storm sustained winds. A few days later, Depression BOB 06 formed which gave additional rainfall and damages to the same places in southern India which were affected by BOB 05 earlier with the worst damages being in Rayalaseema region of Andhra Pradesh. In the month of December, a low pressure area entered into the Andaman Sea from the West Pacific Ocean and it intensified gradually into a cyclonic storm named as Jawad. Initially expected to make landfall over Odisha but due to extremely high wind shear, it weakened rapidly into a low pressure area without making a landfall.

== Systems ==
=== Depression BOB 01 ===
- Depression (IMD)
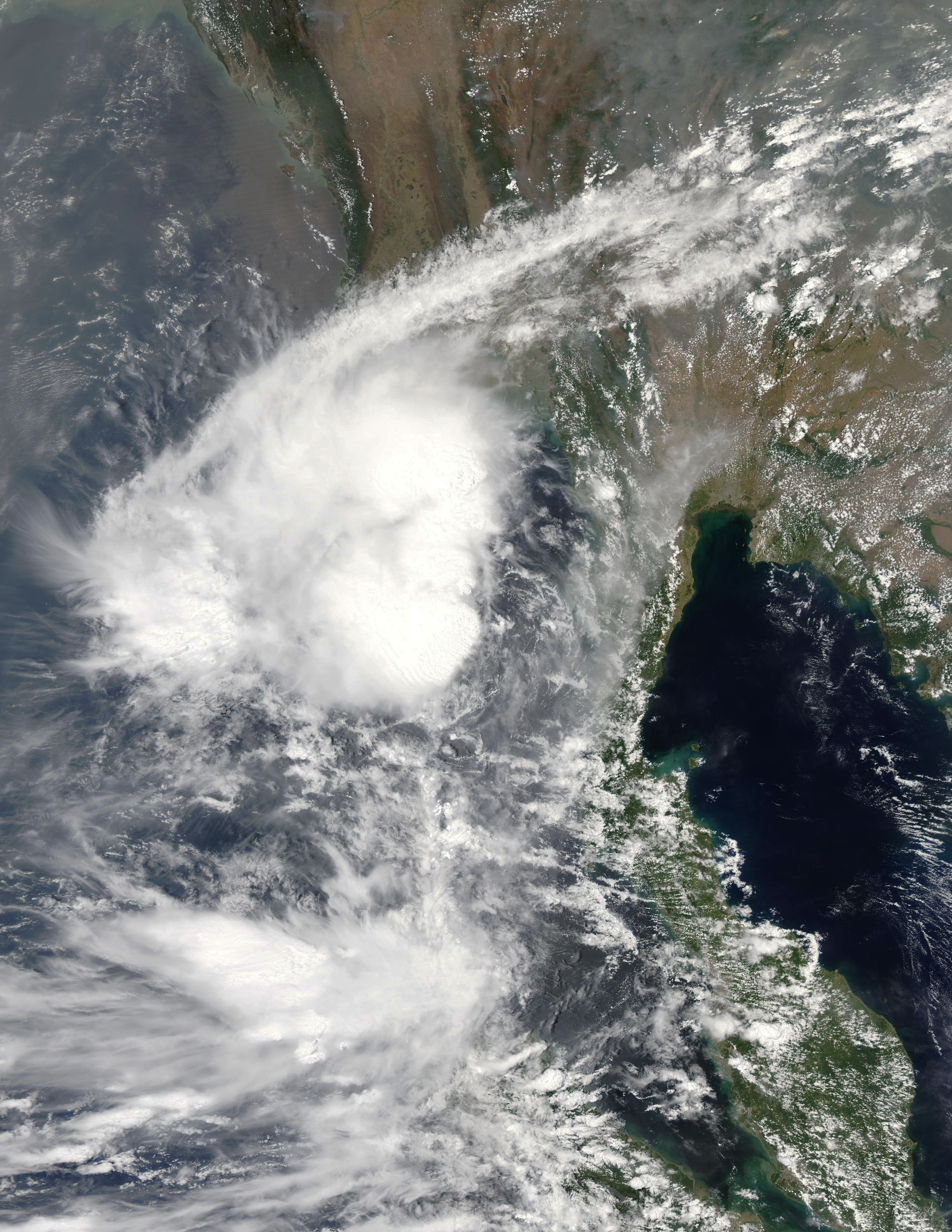
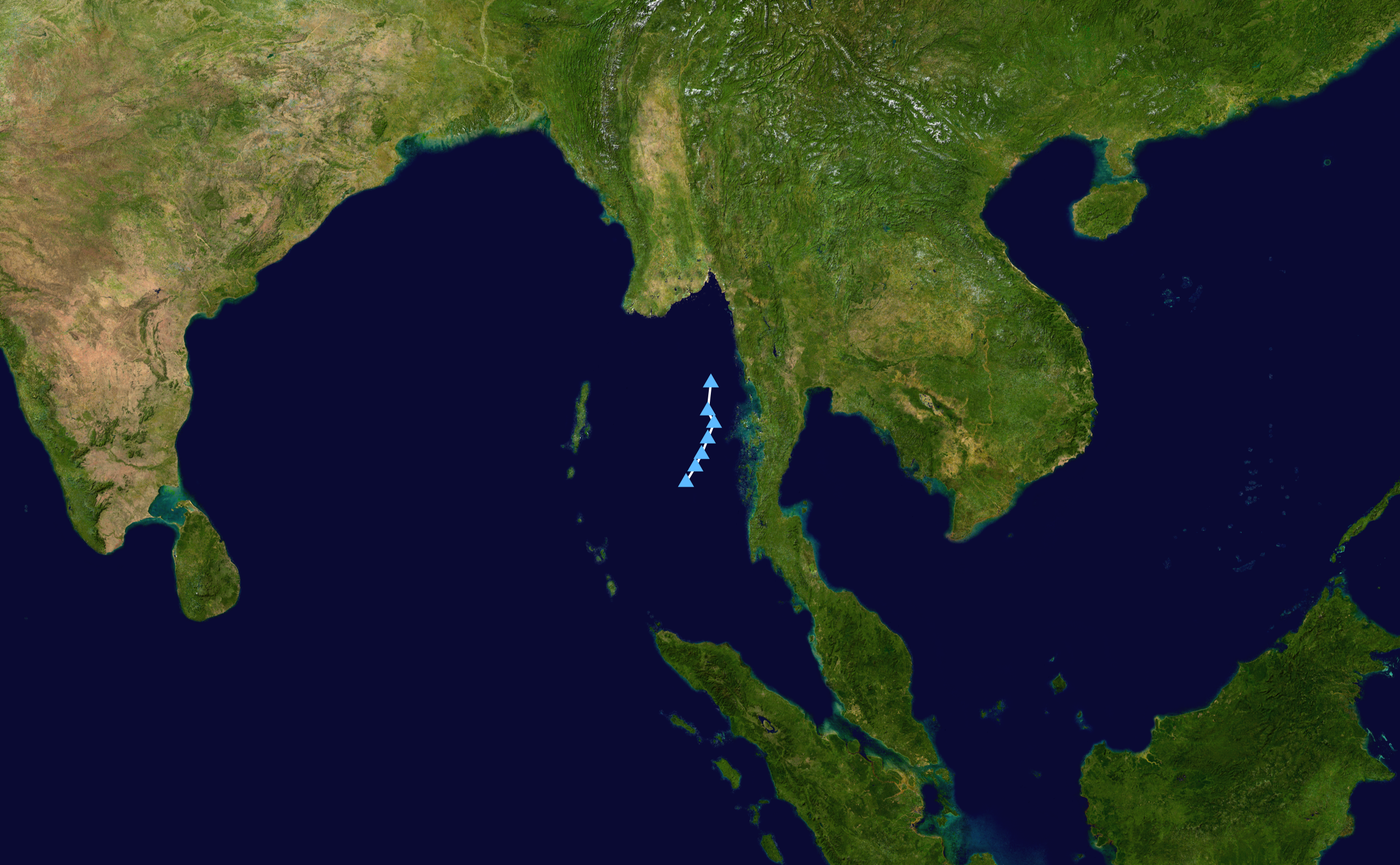
- Duration: April 2 – April 3
- Peak intensity: 45 km/h (30 mph) (3-min); 1000 hPa (mbar)

A tropical wave developed stretching between the Malay Peninsula and the equatorial Indian Ocean. From this wave a cyclonic circulation formed on March 26 over the southeast Bay of Bengal. The strong pulse of the Madden–Julian oscillation, high Tropical Cyclone Heat Potential, moderate sea surface temperatures up to 29–30 °C (84–86 °F), and moderate wind shear, caused the system intensify into a low-pressure area on March 31. An anticyclonic circulation in southeast Asia and an upper tropospheric ridge in the westerlies caused the system to move north-northeastwards. These conditions influenced the system and its intensification as it became a well-marked low-pressure area on April 1 at 09:00 UTC (14:30 IST), and later becoming a depression on April 2 at 00:00 UTC (05:30 IST). Satellite imagery revealed that during its intensification, the clouds of the system organised and developed a low-level circulation center with intense to very intense convection at its center. It continued to maintain its intensity, however, at 00:00 UTC (05:30 IST) on April 3, vertical wind shear increased, causing the system to weaken slightly and the system's clouds to become disorganised, however, a scatterometer pass revealed that it still maintained its intensity. On April 3, at 03:00 UTC (08:30 IST), the clouds further became disorganised, while maintaining its low-level circulation. The system continued to weaken under similar unfavourable conditions with further disorganising of clouds, and at 06:00 UTC (11:30 IST), the system was downgraded to a well-marked low-pressure area, with the system barely having a circulation.

The influence of the system caused light to moderate rainfall in most places of Andaman Islands and heavy rainfall in few places. The system's remnant low caused isolated rainfall over the Myanmar coast. Estimated winds of up to 40 to 50 km/h (25 to 30 mph) gusting up to 60 km/h (35 mph) were recorded on the island. The first tropical depression of the basin, it was also a rare disturbance since it formed in early April while the most cyclogenesis occurs during mid-April or throughout May.

=== Extremely Severe Cyclonic Storm Tauktae ===
- Extremely severe cyclonic storm (IMD)
- Category 4 tropical cyclone (SSHWS)
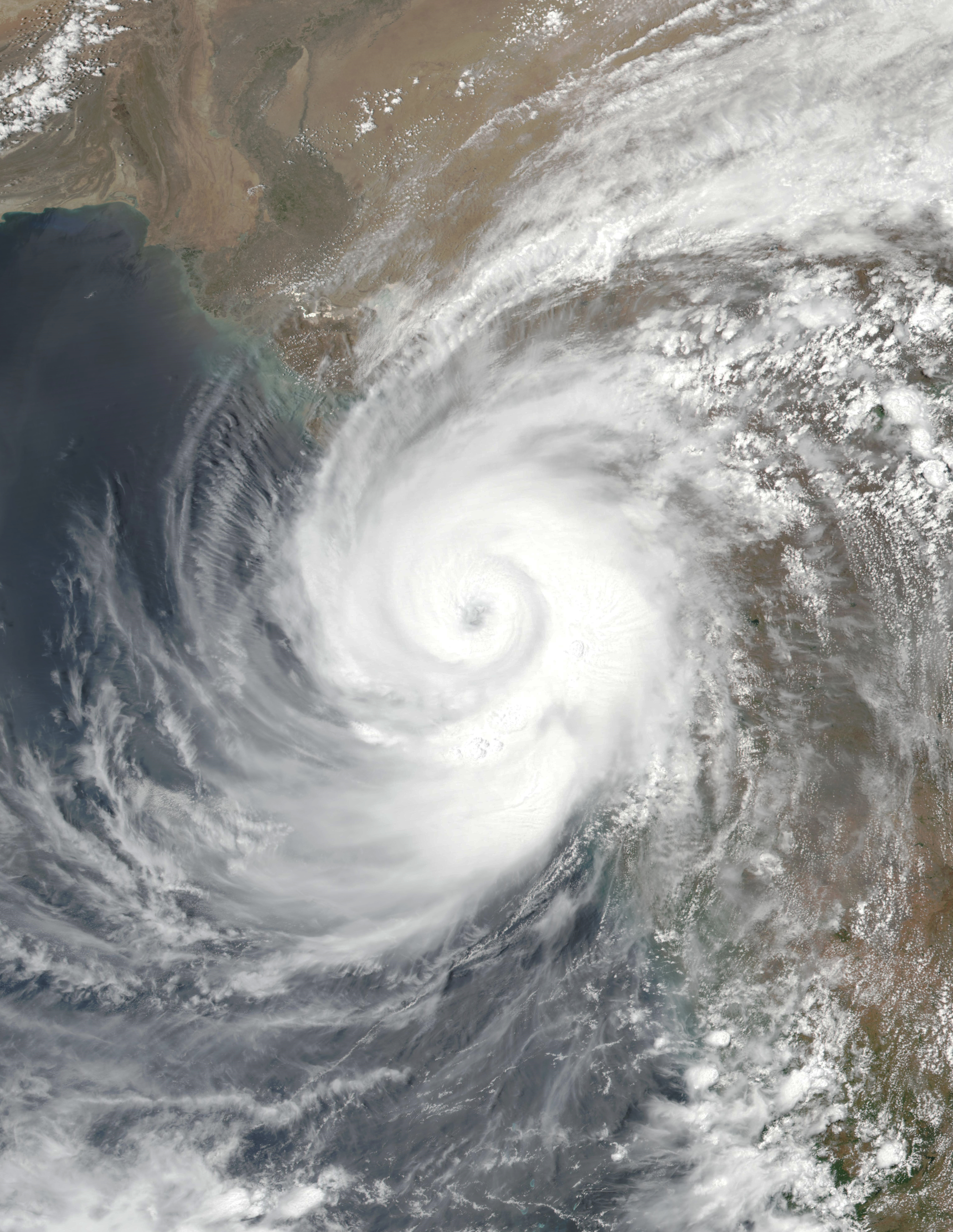
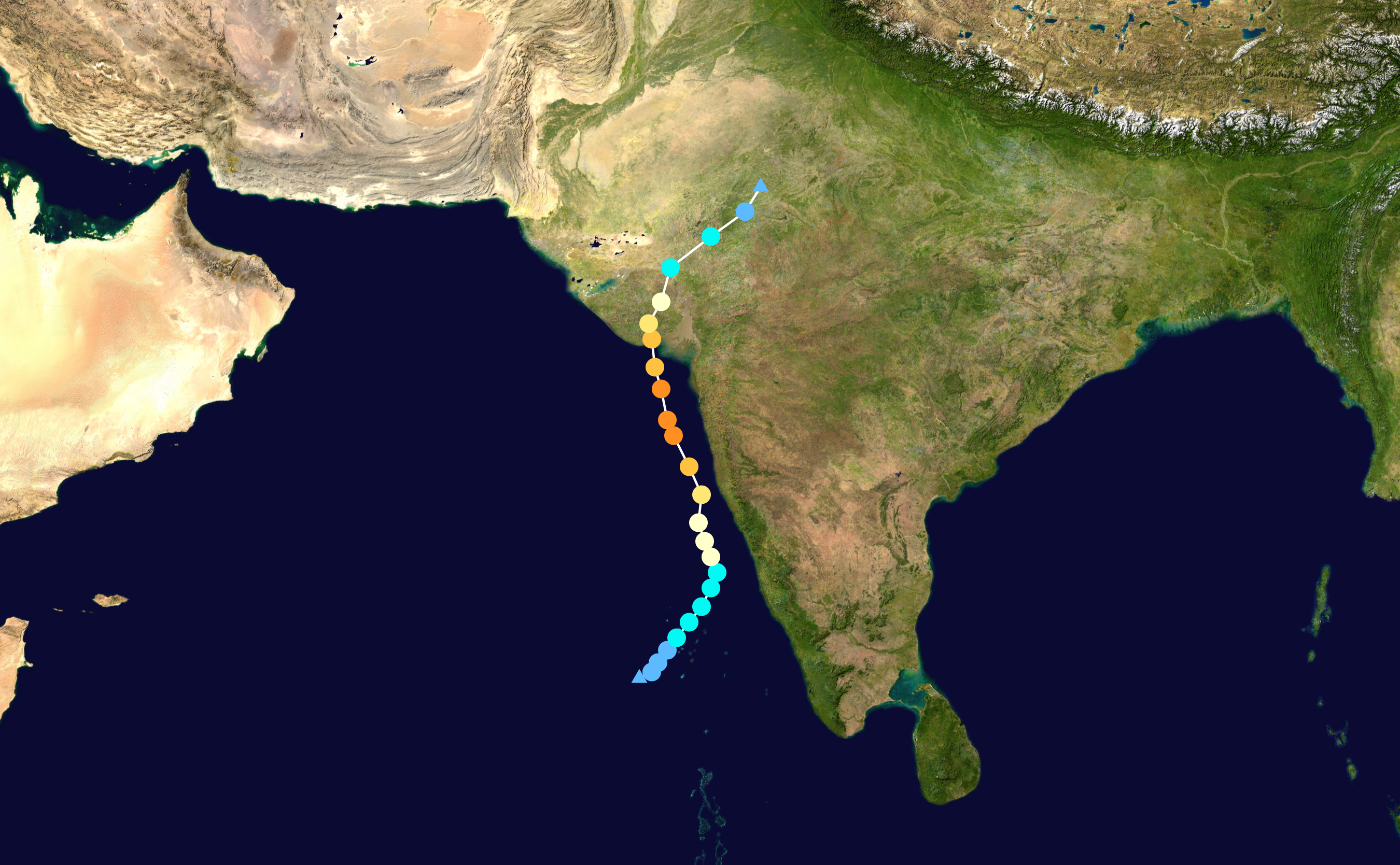
- Duration: May 14 – May 19
- Peak intensity: 185 km/h (115 mph) (3-min); 950 hPa (mbar)

On May 14, a depression formed in the Arabian Sea off the coast of Kerala. The JTWC began monitoring the depression, and designated it as Tropical Cyclone 01A. The system gradually intensified, before intensifying into a Deep Depression by 12:00 UTC (17:30 IST) that day. Around 18:00 UTC (23:30 IST) that day, the system intensified into a Cyclonic Storm, and it was given the name Tauktae by the IMD. (Note: The name Tauktae (Burmese: တောက်တဲ့, [taʊʔ.tɛ̰]) was contributed by Myanmar and means "gecko" in Burmese) It later intensified into a Severe Cyclonic Storm at 15:00 UTC (20:30 IST) in May 15. Tauktae's intensification was unusual as it intensified from a depression to a severe cyclonic storm over a period of just two days, with equivalent storms generally taking four to five days to intensify into a severe cyclonic storm. Three hours later, the JTWC upgraded Tauktae to a Category 1-equivalent tropical cyclone on the Saffir–Simpson scale. Tauktae further intensified into a Very Severe Cyclonic Storm at 00:00 UTC (05:30 IST) May 16. At 06:00 UTC (11:30 IST) that day, the JTWC upgraded the storm further to a Category 2 tropical cyclone. INSAT imagery showed that the cyclone had developed an eye by 09:00 UTC (14:30 IST). However, the eye had started to degrade by 15:00 UTC (20:30 IST), according to INSAT imagery, and remained ragged for the rest of the storm's lifetime.

At 03:00 UTC on May 17, Tauktae intensified into an Extremely Severe Cyclonic Storm on 03:00 UTC (08:30 IST) of May 17, which was unexpected since many forecaster predicted that it would be a very severe cyclonic storm. The JTWC upgraded Tauktae to a Category 4-equivalent tropical cyclone soon afterward. However, Tauktae quickly weakened into a Category 3-equivalent tropical cyclone later that day. The cyclone made landfall in the region of Saurashtra between Diu and Una at around 15:30 UTC (21:00 IST). After landfall, Tauktae weakened to a Very Severe Cyclonic Storm. Wind speeds of approximately 150 to 175 km/h (93 to 109 mph) were recorded at the district of Diu in the union territory of Dadra and Nagar Haveli and Daman and Diu. It became one of strongest tropical cyclone to make landfall in the Indian state of Gujarat since the 1998 Gujarat cyclone. Meanwhile, the JTWC issued their last tropical cyclone warning on the storm at 21:00 UTC (02:30 IST) on May 17. The weakening trend although slower than usual due to the brown ocean effect mostly because of the influence of a western disturbance, which continued as it moved further inland until 14:00 UTC (19:30 IST) on May 19, when it was downgraded to a well-marked low pressure area over Eastern Rajasthan and adjoining west Madhya Pradesh, later dissipating. The combination of a western disturbance and the remnants of Cyclone Tauktae have also caused heavy rainfall in Northwestern India.

A total of 174 people were confirmed to have been killed by the storm, and 81 others are still missing. Heavy rainfall was reported over areas of Kerala, causing flash floods and waterlogging soil; fishing was temporarily banned in the area due to rough seas. Parts of Kerala and Lakshadweep were placed under a red alert on May 14. The second state experienced heavy rainfall as the cyclone tracked west of the Indian coast. In Chellanan, a village in Ernakulam district, homes were submerged underwater due to unexpected rain and coastal erosion. Agricultural losses statewide was ₹828 crore (US$113 million). The administration opened up a relief camp at the local St. Mary's School for the inhabitants of low-lying areas. Due to the ongoing second wave of the COVID-19 pandemic in India, isolated testing facilities were arranged. The most severe effects of Cyclone Tauktae occurred in the states of Maharashtra and Saurashtra in Gujarat. The latter state reported the losses of ₹10,000 crore (US$1.37 billion). The city of Mumbai experienced heavy rainfall, very strong trees and waves crashed the shores. Trees were uprooted and streets were waterlogged. It was the strongest cyclone since Cyclone Nisarga in 2020. As a precaution, flight operations at Chhatrapati Shivaji Maharaj International Airport were temporarily halted before resuming hours later. The cyclone also affected neighbouring countries like Pakistan, Maldives and Sri Lanka. In the Sindh province of Pakistan, four people died due to a roof collapse caused by strong winds.

=== Very Severe Cyclonic Storm Yaas ===
- Very severe cyclonic storm (IMD)
- Category 1 tropical cyclone (SSHWS)
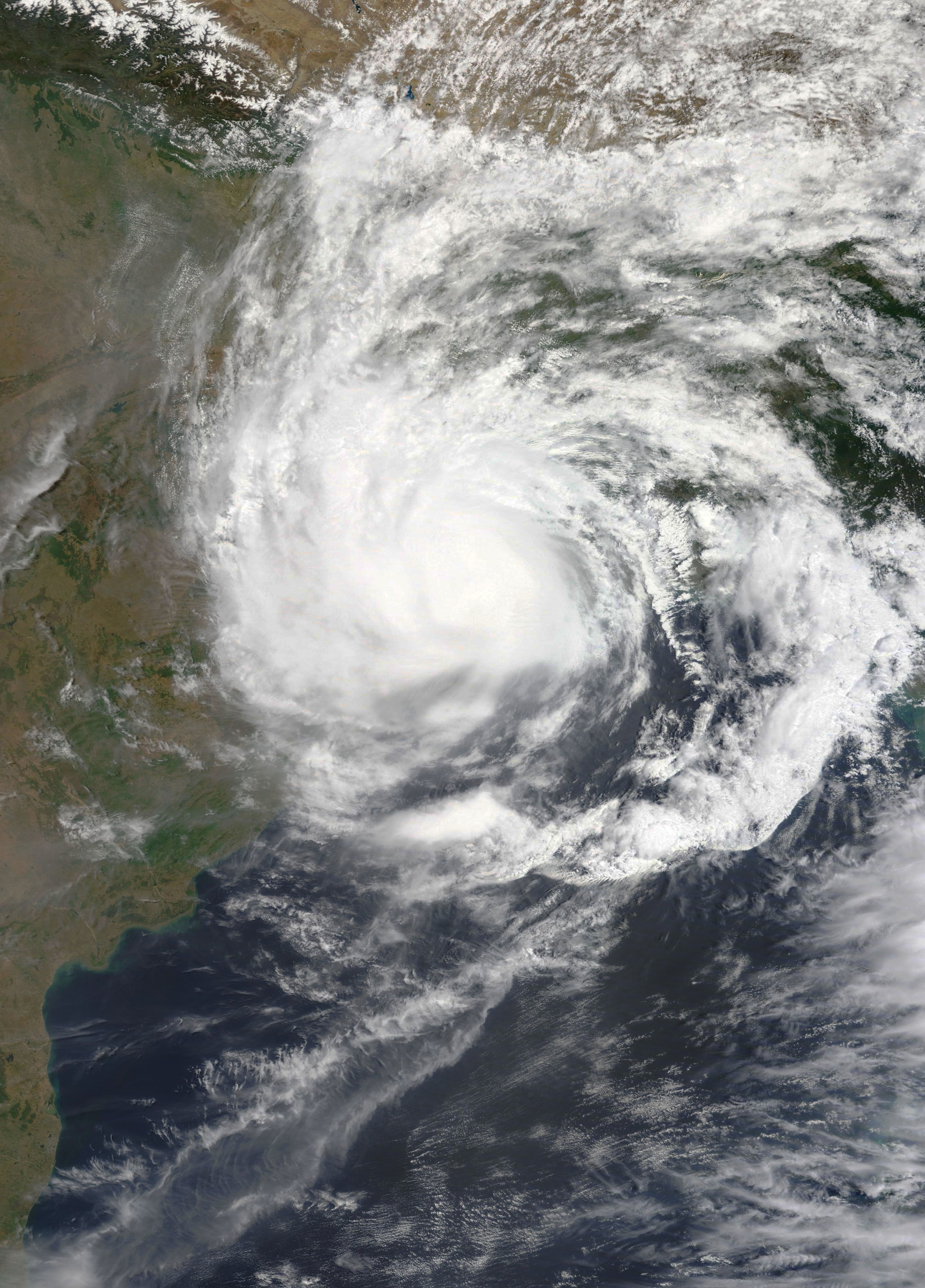
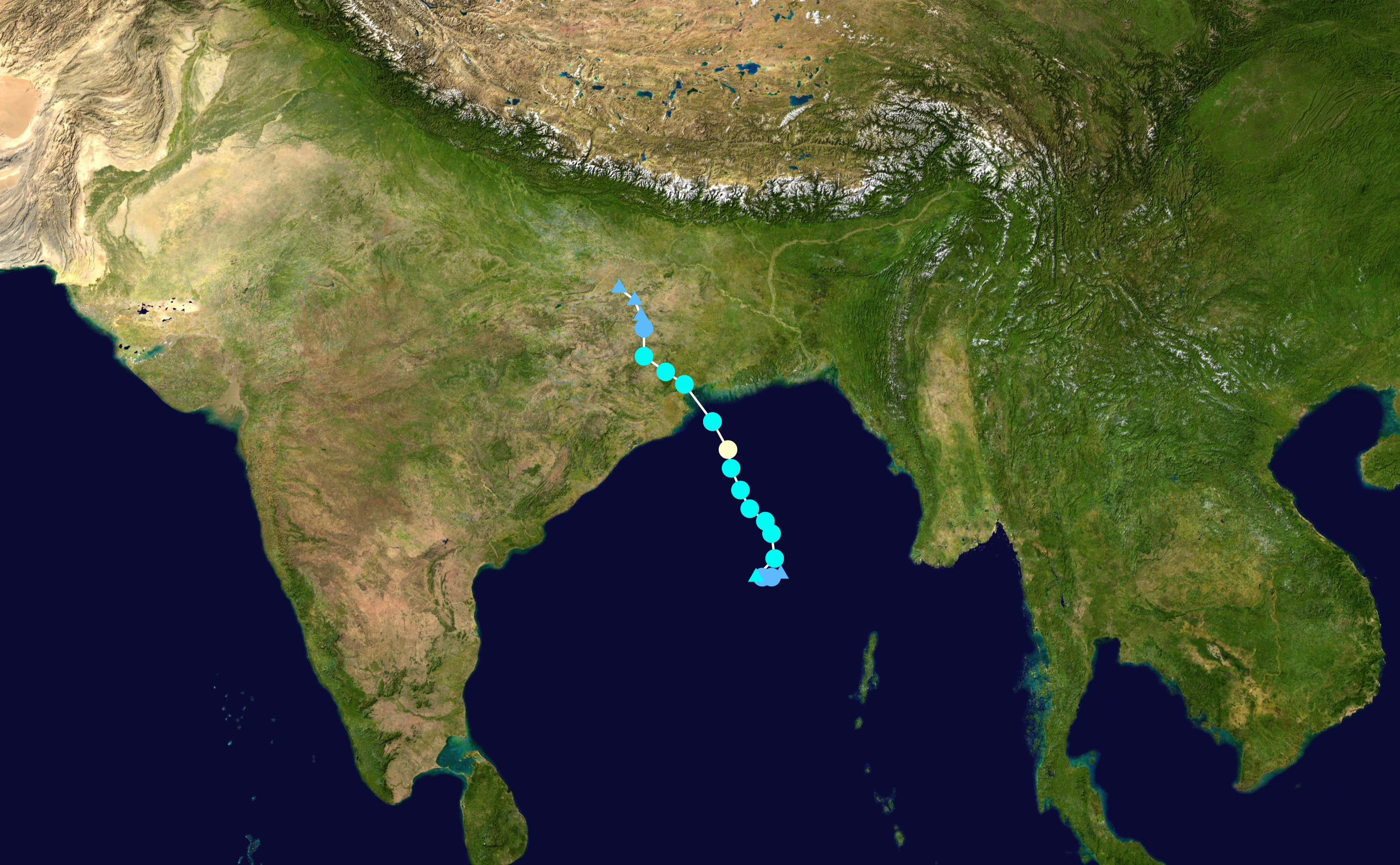
- Duration: May 23 – May 28
- Peak intensity: 140 km/h (85 mph) (3-min); 970 hPa (mbar)

On May 22, a low-pressure area formed in the Bay of Bengal. On the next day, at 09:30 UTC (15:00 IST), the disturbance organised into a Depression, and was assigned the designation BOB 02 by the IMD. Later that day, the JTWC issued a Tropical Cyclone Formation Alert for the system. The storm subsequently intensified into a Deep Depression at 15:00 UTC (20:30 IST) on May 23. Several hours later, the storm further intensified into a Cyclonic Storm at 03:00 UTC (08:30 IST) on May 24, and was given the name Yaas by the IMD. (Note: The name Yaas (Arabic: ياس, [jaːs]) was contributed by Oman and means "jasmine" in Arabic.) Meanwhile, JTWC designated as Tropical Cyclone 02B. On May 24, at 18:00 UTC (23:30 IST) it rapidly intensified into a severe cyclonic storm, then becoming a very severe cyclonic storm on 15:00 UTC (20:30 IST) of May 25 despite being present in moderate to high easterly wind shear. Meanwhile, JTWC upgraded it into a Category 1 tropical cyclone on 15:00 UTC (20:30 IST) of the same day. The cyclone made landfall north of Dhamra Port and south of Bahanaga at around 03:30 UTC (09:00 IST) in May 26. The process completed at around 05:30 UTC (11:00 IST ), with estimated winds up to 130 to 140 km/h (80 to 85 mph). Storm surge caused most of the damage in south Bengal and northwestern Odisha. After landfall it started to weaken rapidly into a severe cyclonic storm then into a cyclonic storm. As it moved further inland towards Nepal, IMD discontinuing advisories for Cyclone Yaas, as it became a well marked low pressure on 00:00 UTC (05:00 IST) of May 28. JTWC later issued their last warning at 09:00 UTC (11:30 IST) in May 26, stating that it rapidly weakened into a tropical storm after landfall. The remnant of Cyclone Yaas continued moving north-northwestwards and impacted Bihar, Jharkhand and eastern Uttar Pradesh. Heavy rainfall and gusty winds were reported in these areas. The cyclone also helped the monsoon to strengthen over the Bay of Bengal, after Tauktae disrupted it on May 15.

Eleven people had been reported dead due to Cyclone Yaas. Of them, two died in a tornado outbreak which struck West Bengal's Hooghly District and North 24 Paraganas, according to Chief Minister Mamata Banerjee. At least 80 homes had been damaged. Another died as a tree fell onto him, and a teen was found dead in a river. Two farmers had also died after being struck by lightning, and an elderly woman was trapped in a collapsed house, eventually dying there. Two individuals were killed as they were crushed by uprooted trees while in Jharkhand, two more people were found dead in a collapsed house on May 27. estimated the total damages in West Bengal from the system to be at ₹20 thousand crore (US$2.76 billion). The most affected states are West Bengal and Odisha. At least 10 million people were affected and 300,000 houses were damaged. Most them were caused by storm surge, high astronomical tides and broken embankments. The West Bengal Government verified that 134 embankments has been damaged. At least two million people were evacuated in the states of West Bengal, Odisha and Jharkhand. Towns of Frazerganj, Bakkhali, Sundarban, Kakdwip, Namkhana, Ganga Sagar and Gosaba were flooded by seawater. As a precautionary measure, airports of Bhubaneswar, Jharsuguda, Kolkata, Rourkela and Durgapur were closed temporarily until May 27. Cyclone Yaas generated high waves and storm surge which crashed the coastal beaches of Digha and Mandarmoni. The concrete embankments broke and seawater flooded the entire Digha—Mandarmoni Belt. Because of big wind field of Cyclone Yaas, Kolkata experienced powerful gusty winds, Alipore Meteorological Department recorded 62 km/h (39 mph) winds. Minimal damage was reported, however high tides caused the Hooghly River to flood neighboring banks like Kalighat, Howrah and Chelta. The cyclone also affected Nepal and Bangladesh. The remnants of Cyclone Yaas made landfall in Nepal and triggered heavy rainfall. Meanwhile, Bangladesh experienced high tide and storm surge which flooded many villages.

=== Deep Depression BOB 03 ===
- Deep depression (IMD)
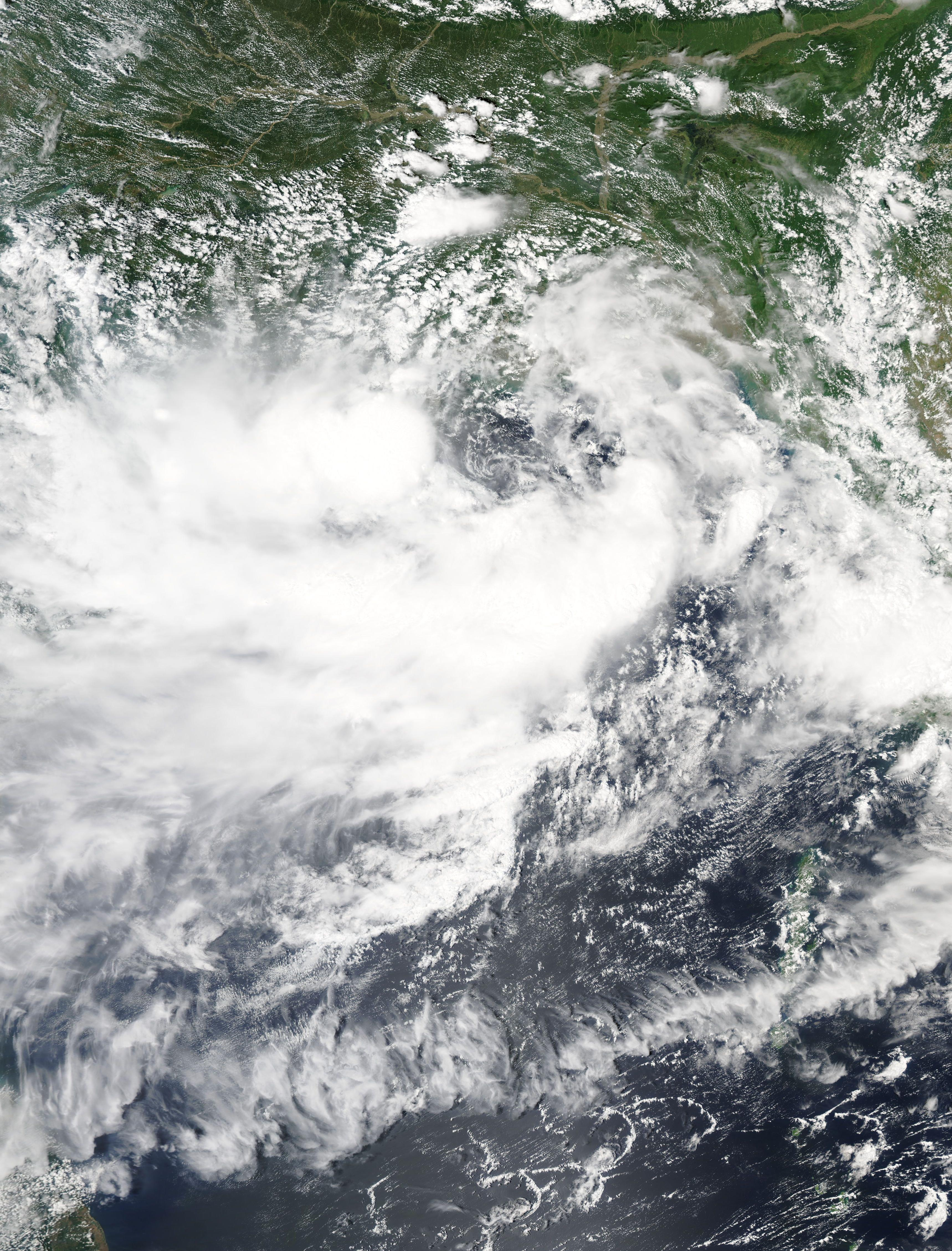
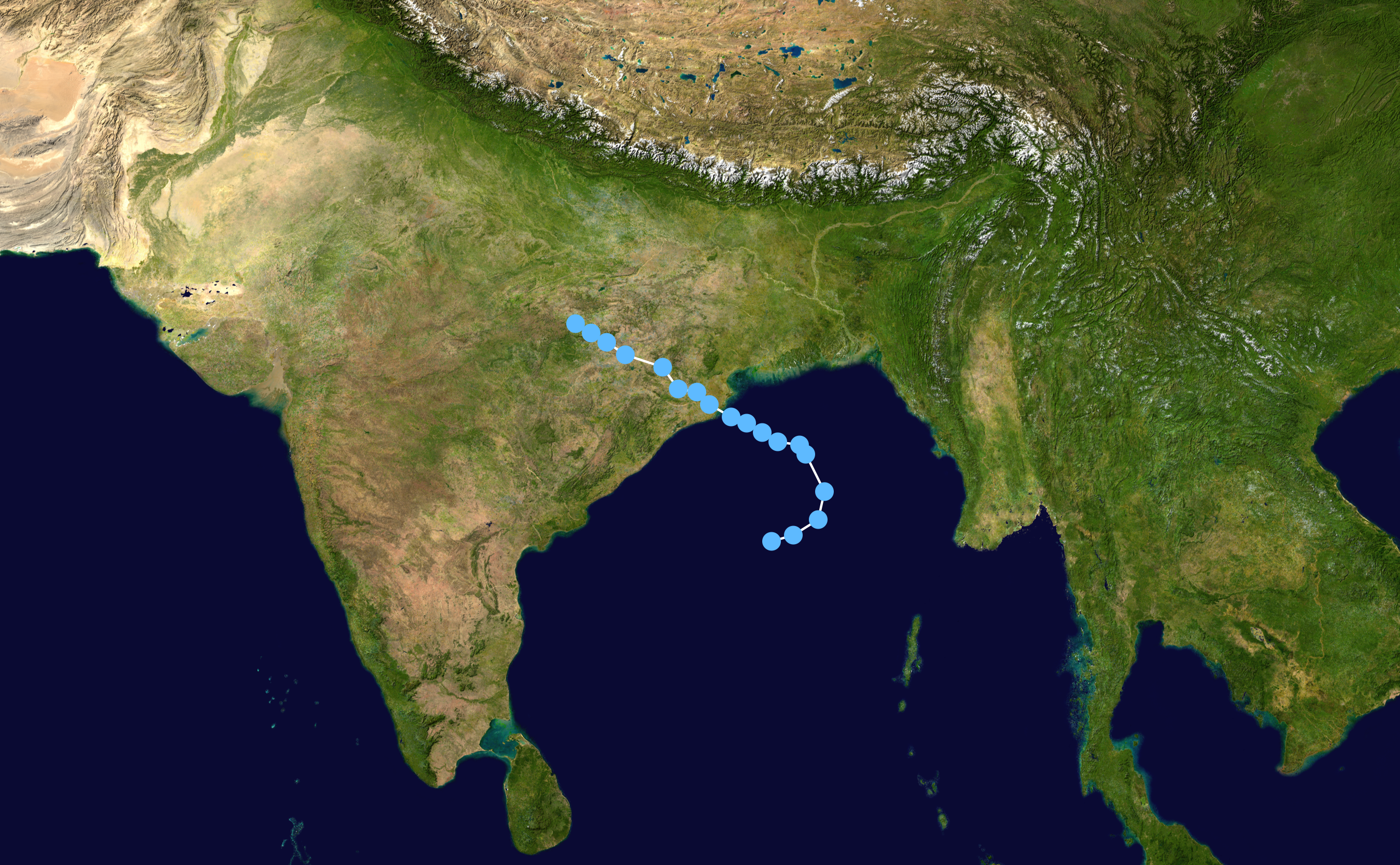
- Duration: September 12 – September 15
- Peak intensity: 55 km/h (35 mph) (3-min); 990 hPa (mbar)

On September 11 at 00:00 UTC (05:30 IST), under an influence of a cyclonic disturbance, an area of low pressure had formed over the east central and the adjoining northeastern Bay of Bengal, which later intensified into a well marked low pressure area, a day later. At 12:00 UTC (17:30 IST) the same day, it further concentrated into a depression as it approached the coast of Odisha. Conditions like low to moderate vertical wind shear, warm sea-surface temperature and strong pulse of Madden Julian Oscillation helped the system's intensification to a depression. Due to the prevailing monsoonal trade winds, the system moved west-northwestwards for the rest of its lifetime. As the system was about to make landfall near Chandbali, Odisha, it further concentrated deep depression at 00:00 UTC (05:30 IST). At the same moment it crossed near Chandbali between 00:00 UTC and 01:00 UTC (05:30 IST and 06:30 IST) as a deep depression. After crossing, it weakened into a depression over the border of Chhattisgarh and Odisha, at 03:00 UTC (08:30 IST) the next day, but it managed to maintain its intensity for the rest of its lifetime, because of the prevailing monsoonal conditions. This unusual phenomenon is called the brown ocean effect. It continued to move on its trajectory, until at 00:00 UTC of September 15, it further weakened into a well-marked low pressure area over northeastern Madhya Pradesh and its neighbourhood. The JTWC didn't tracked the system, but they did monitored as an invest.

The system caused vigorous monsoonal conditions over eastern India, mainly Odisha and West Bengal and central India. It led to extremely heavy rainfall over few places of Odisha, isolated places of Chhattisgarh between September 12 and 13 and over eastern Madhya Pradesh on September 14. As the system moved westwards, it interacted with another low pressure system off the coast of Gujarat caused extremely heavy rainfall over Saurashtra region of Gujarat and the Konkan division of Maharashtra on September 13. The outer bands of the system also caused extremely heavy rainfall in isolated places of West Bengal on September 14. Three fatalities have been reported, all from Odisha and 1.953 million people had been affected. Some cities recorded exceptionally heavy rainfall like Puri recorded 341 mm (13.4 in) of rain, breaking the 88-year-old record which was made in 1934 and Bhubaneswar which recorded 195 mm (7.7 in) of rain, breaking the 63-year-old record which was made in 1958. A goods train which ran on the Angul – Talcher Road rail route derailed at around 02:30 IST (20:00 UTC) and fell over a river. No one was injured. The Kolkata airport was inundated in floodwaters causing disruptions in flight's timings however no flights were cancelled.

=== Cyclonic Storm Gulab ===
- Cyclonic storm (IMD)
- Tropical storm (SSHWS)
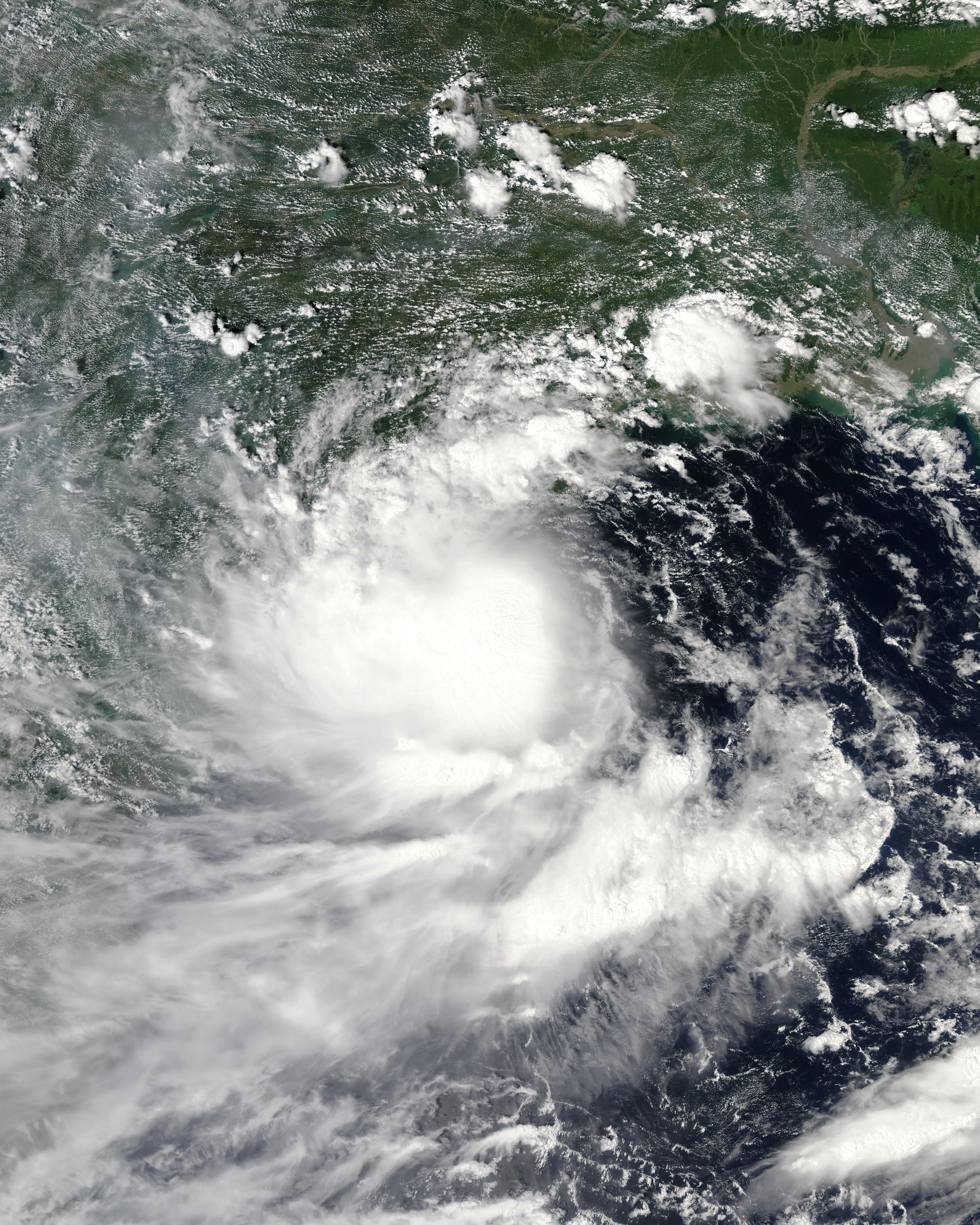
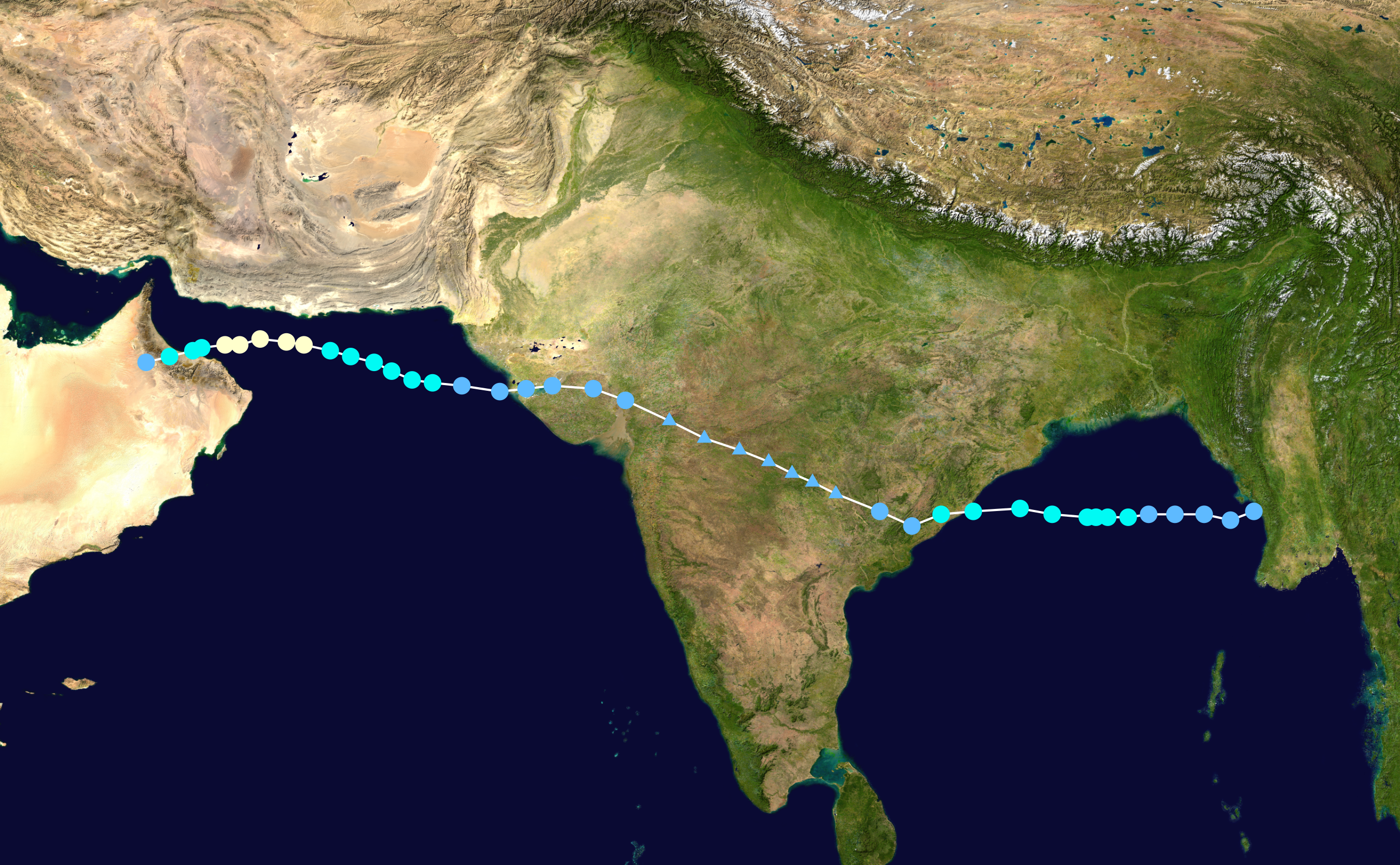
- Duration: September 24 – September 28
- Peak intensity: 85 km/h (50 mph) (3-min); 992 hPa (mbar)

On September 24, the JTWC noted a cyclone which was producing tropical storm-force winds located over the east-central Bay of Bengal, 211 nmi (391 km; 243 mi) south of Chittagong, Bangladesh, designating the system as 03B. The IMD noted the system as a low pressure area at 03:00 UTC (08:30 IST); the system formed from a cyclonic circulation which persisted over the Gulf of Martaban. It was later upgraded to a well-marked low-pressure area at 11:00 UTC (16:30 IST), as it developed a cyclonic vortex at 06:00 UTC (11:30 IST). At 15:00 UTC (20:30 IST), the IMD upgraded it to a Depression, as the convection had further organized and the clouds were moving in a curved manner. Favorable conditions such as moderate to high sea-surface temperatures, the Madden–Julian oscillation being favorable for tropical cyclone development, and low vertical wind shear allowed intensification. By 03:00 UTC the next day, the system was upgraded to a Deep Depression, as the cloud further organized near the center. There were also the presence of warm moist air over the center of the system. At 15:00 UTC (20:30 IST), the IMD upgraded it to a cyclonic storm named Gulab as its convection had become better organized with a defined central dense overcast. (Note: The name Gulab (Urdu: گلاب, [ɡʊlɑːb]) was contributed by Pakistan and means "rose" in Urdu.) As it continued westward, the cloud bands of Gulab had touched the coastal regions of northern Andhra Pradesh and southern Odisha, which indicated that it had started its landfall process at about 18:00 IST (12:30 UTC) on September 26. By 17:00 UTC (10:30 IST), it had crossed 20 km (10 mi) north of Kalingapatnam. At 21:00 UTC (02:30 IST), the JTWC had issued its final warning prior to landfall. Three hours later, the IMD downgraded it to a deep depression, as it had lost its energy after travelling over rough Indian terrain. It further weakened into a depression by 20:00 IST (14:30 UTC) as it entered the state of Telangana. It maintained its intensity as it travelled westwards until at 14:00 IST (08:30 UTC), when it weakened into a well-marked low pressure area over west Vidarbha. The remnant of Gulab later became Cyclone Shaheen over the Arabian Sea.

Gulab caused severe floods and landslide in several states in southern and central India killing 17 people and caused ₹20 billion (US$269 million) in damage. In Andhra Pradesh, heavy damage were caused by Gulab over Srikakulam and Vizianagaram districts. Communications and electricity were disrupted and uprooted trees caused congestion in roads. The city of Vizianagaram was inundated with waterlogging because of improper underground drainage system and hundreds of trees and billboards were fallen in different places. In Vizag, heavy rainfall caused regional floods and gusty winds which caused uprooting of several trees. The heavy rainfall also caused the inundation of the airport. The city recorded 282 mm (11.1 in) in 24 hours making the wettest September only behind the year 2005. Two people died because of drowning. As Gulab weakened into a deep depression, it entered Telangana and Chhattisgarh dumping enormous amounts of heavy rainfall. In Telangana especially Hyderabad, flash flooding caused disruption in traffic and severe hardships to the residents. Two people were washed away by an overflowed stream. Because of the above situation, the government of Telangana declared a holiday for all government offices, schools, and institutions. The heavy rainfall caused the Musi river to overflow. Heavy rainfall were also seen in Chhattisgarh. The remnant of Cyclone Gulab, caused devastating rainfall and landslides in Maharashtra. According to the State Disaster Response Force, thirteen people and 206 livestock were killed by the flooding from eight districts of the state. Four people went missing after a Maharashtra state transport bus was swept away by an overflowing stream near Umarkhed, Maharashtra, however two of the six travellers were rescued successfully.

=== Severe Cyclonic Storm Shaheen ===
- Severe cyclonic storm (IMD)
- Category 1 tropical cyclone (SSHWS)
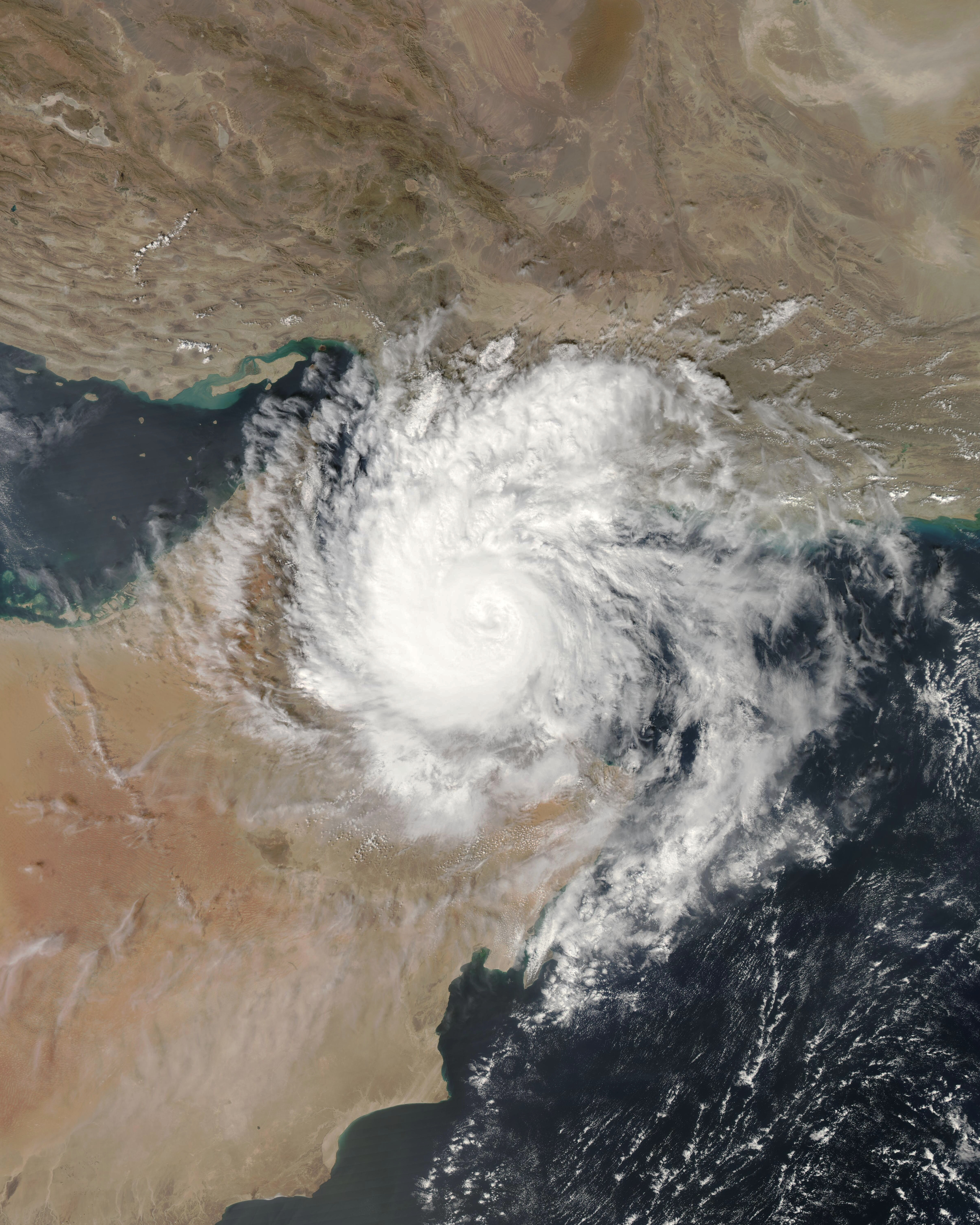
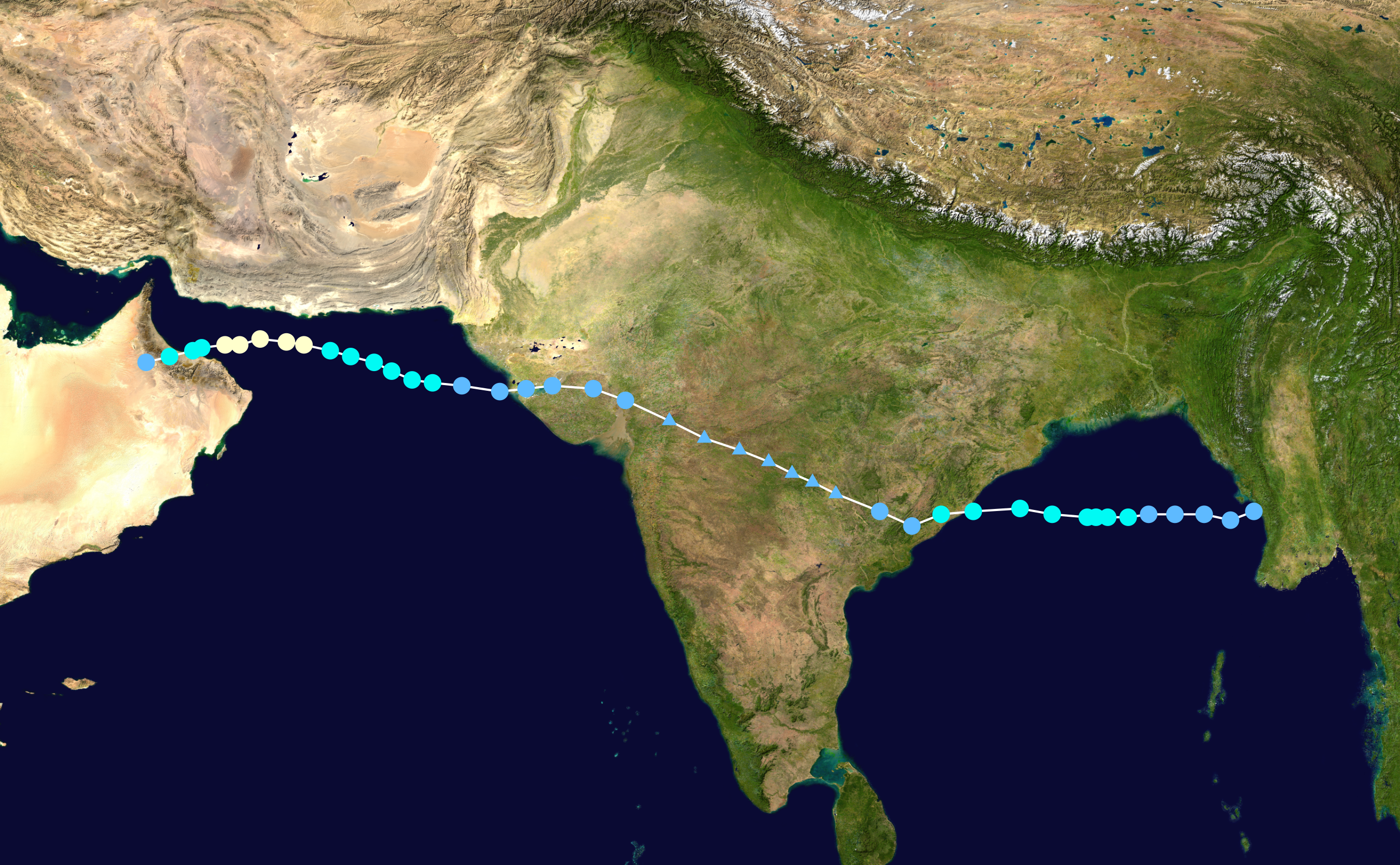
- Duration: September 30 – October 4
- Peak intensity: 110 km/h (70 mph) (3-min); 984 hPa (mbar)

On September 29, the remnant of Cyclone Gulab entered northeastern Arabian Sea as a well-marked low pressure area. At 17:30 UTC (23:00 IST) that same day, the JTWC issued a TCFA as it developed a well-defined convection and a low-level circulation center. At 00:00 UTC (05:30 IST) next day, the IMD upgraded the system to a depression over the Gulf of Kutch, thus designating it as ARB 02. INSAT 3D satellite imagery showed that the convection had increased near its center. At 21:00 UTC (02:30 IST), the JTWC upgraded it to a tropical storm, reassigning it the designation 03B as the agency viewed Shaheen as a continuation of Cyclone Gulab. At the same moment, the IMD upgraded it to a deep depression. Six hours later, the system was further upgraded to a cyclonic storm named Shaheen, as spiral cloudbands were seen wrapping over the storm's low-level circulation. (Note: The name Shaheen (Arabic: شاهين, [ʃaːhiːn]) was contributed by Qatar and refers to the peregrine falcon (Falco peregrinus) in Arabic.) At 03:00 UTC (08:30 IST) the next day, the JTWC upgraded it to a Category 1-equivalent tropical cyclone as it developed an eye-like feature. However, it struggled for further development, due to lack of convection. By 06:00 UTC (11:30 IST), the cyclone developed a defined but ragged eye. At 09:00 UTC (14:30 IST), the JTWC downgraded it to a tropical storm, but six hours later, the JTWC re-upgraded it to a Category 1 tropical cyclone. Between 19:00 UTC and 20:00 UTC (00:30 IST and 01:30 IST), Shaheen made landfall over the northern Oman coast, making it one of the rare cyclones to strike this region since 1890. At 21:00 UTC (02:30 IST), the JTWC issued its final warning for the storm as it made landfall. After making landfall, Shaheen underwent a rapid weakening because of the dry landmass of the Arabian Desert. From 00:00 UTC till 12:00 UTC, it rapidly weakened from a severe cyclonic storm to a well-marked low pressure area. Satellite imagery showed that after making landfall, the cloud mass had quickly become disorganized and the center became less defined.

Cyclone Shaheen caused devastating effects mainly in Oman and Iran, killing 14 people and caused a loss of OMR200 million (US$520 million), mainly in Oman. The precursor of Cyclone Shaheen caused heavy to very heavy rainfall in parts of Gujarat. As the cyclone strengthened, it moved along the Iranian coast generating dust storms which affected the province of Sistan and Baluchestan. Due to the dust storm caused by the cyclone, many people went to hospital as they suffered of eye and respiratory problems. Two fisherman was found dead out of the five fishermen that went missing. In Oman, the cyclone caused widespread heavy rainfall that the country had never seen. Because of the dry landmass, it couldn't absorb water quickly, causing deadly flash flooding. Most of the damage happened in the region of Batineh, which experienced wind up to 60 kn (110 km/h; 70 mph) and waves up to 12 m (39 ft). It killed 12 people in Oman alone. In United Arab Emirates, the country experienced light rainfall in parts of Dubai, Al Ain and Ajman. Dust storms were also reported which reduced visibility. The remnant of Cyclone Shaheen caused heavy rainfall in Yemen and damaging historical sites. Reports of around 20 vehicles had been washed away by flash flooding.

=== Depression ARB 03 ===
- Depression (IMD)
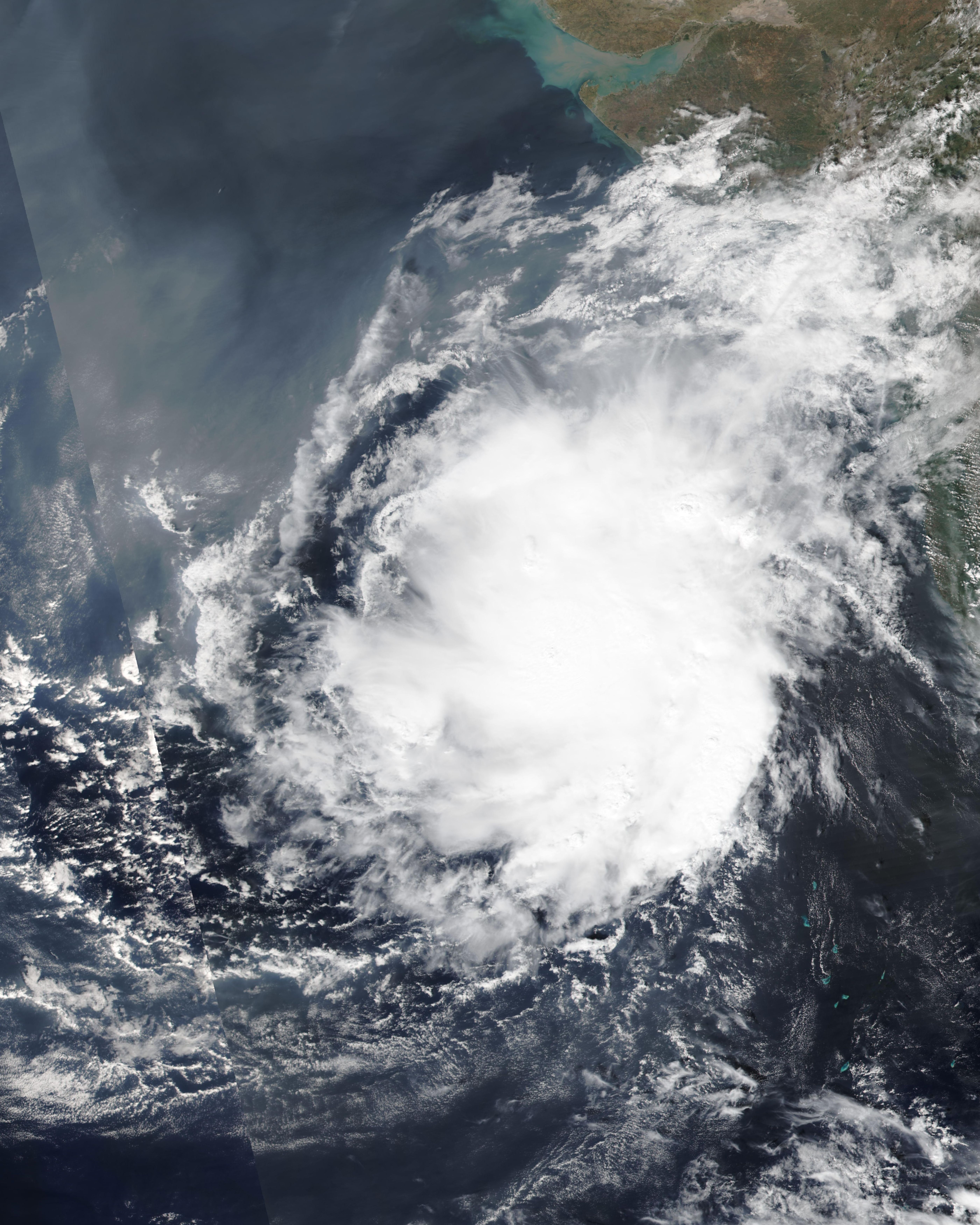
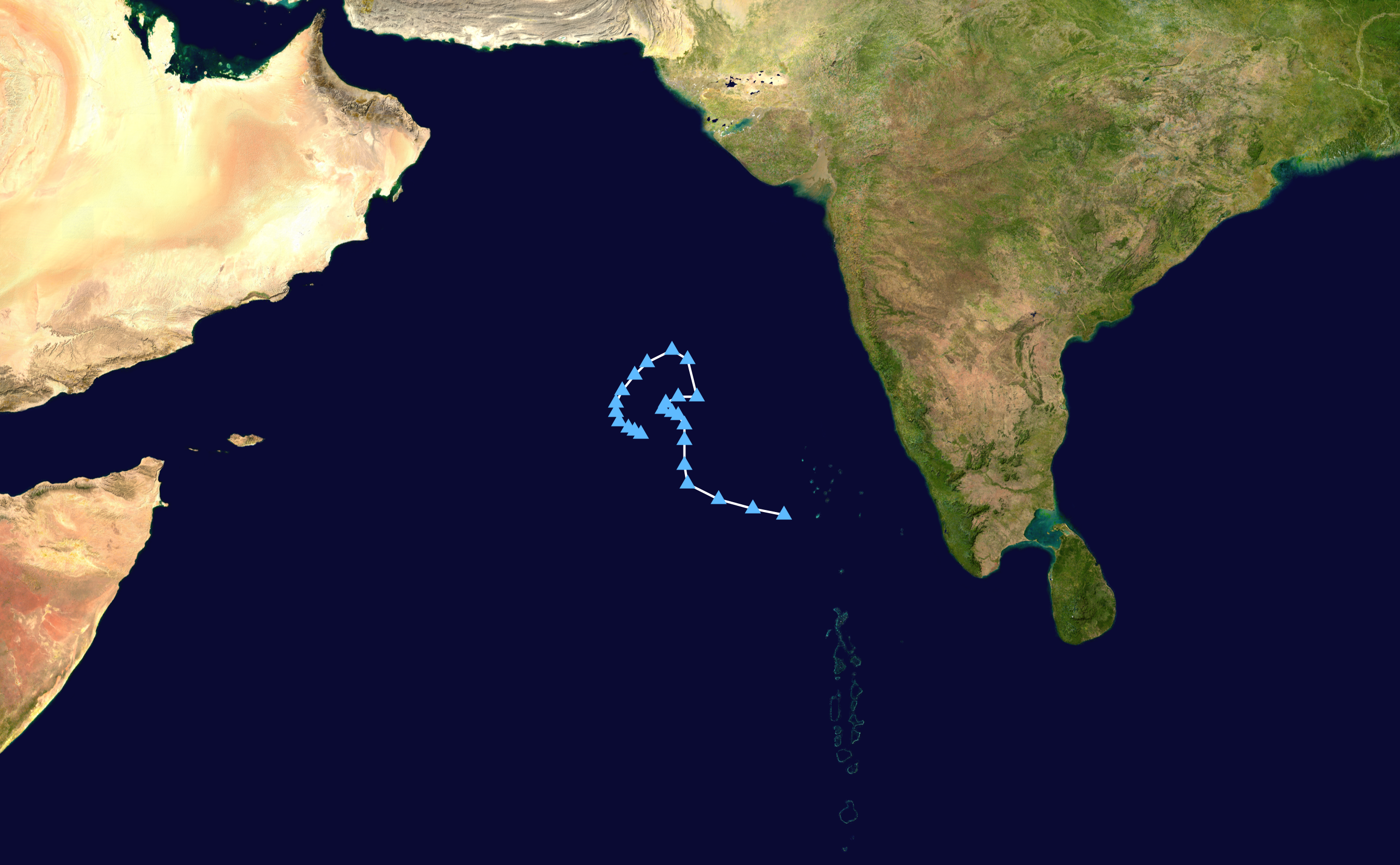
- Duration: November 7 – November 9
- Peak intensity: 45 km/h (30 mph) (3-min); 1002 hPa (mbar)

On October 27, a cyclonic circulation spawned a low pressure area over the southern Bay of Bengal. The low travelled westward, tracking over Kanyakumari before emerging over the southeastern Arabian Sea by November 3. The low later turned north-northwestward, developing into a well-marked low pressure area by November 6. Warm sea surface temperatures of 28–29 °C (82–84 °F), little dry air, and moderate wind shear allowed the system to further organize to a depression by 03:00 UTC on November 7. Throughout the next day, the depression gradually curve southwestward as it was steered by easterly and northeasterly winds in the mid and upper troposphere. Simultaneously, an increase in wind shear led to gradual weakening, eventually causing the system to degenerate into a well-marked low pressure area over the central Arabian Sea by 00:00 UTC on November 9. The JTWC also tracked the system, from 18:00 UTC (23:30 IST) of November 4 while located at 537 nautical miles (995 km; 618 mi) south-southwest of Mumbai until the same time of November 6.

=== Depression BOB 05 (04B) ===
- Depression (IMD)
- Tropical storm (SSHWS)
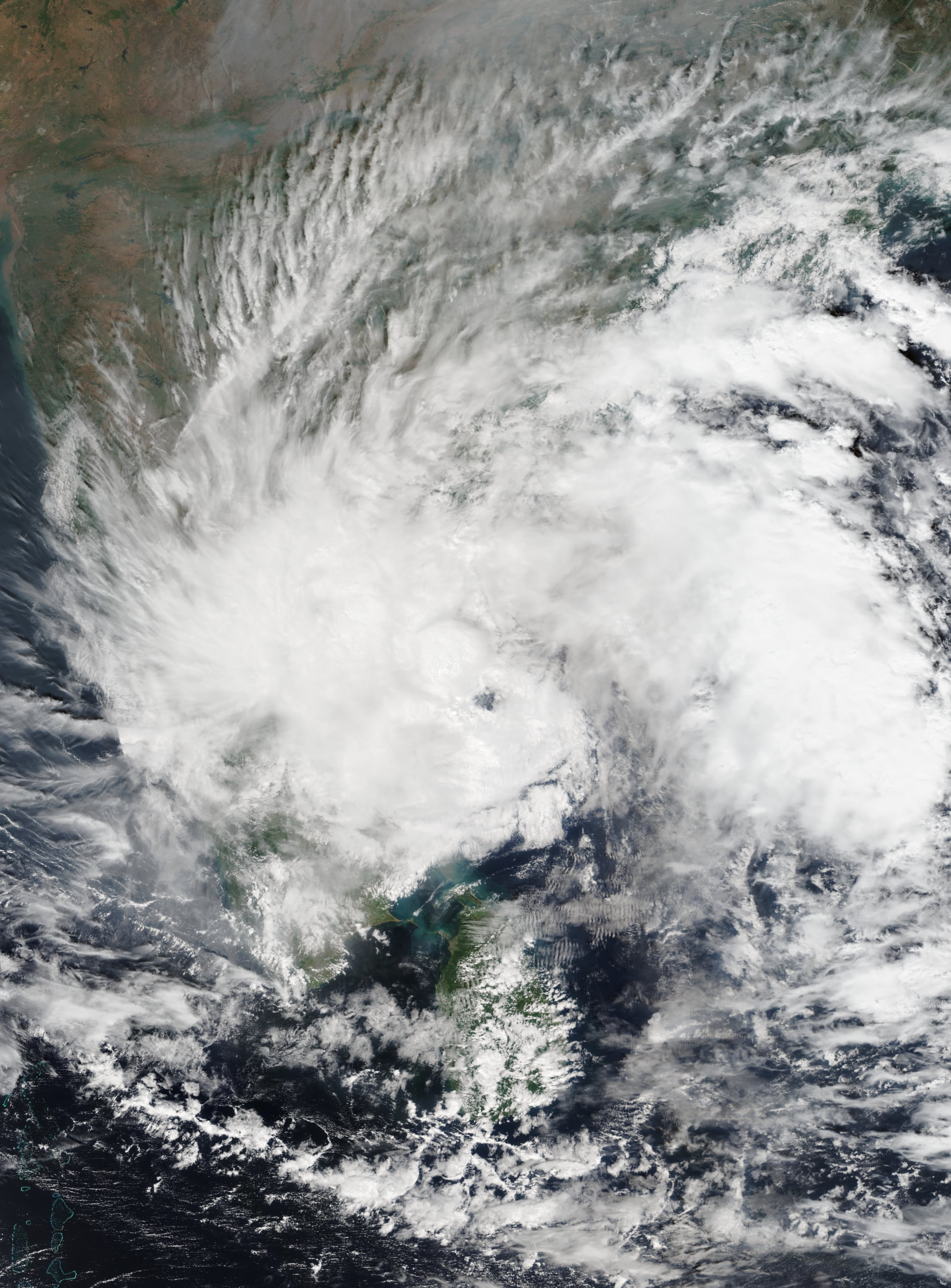
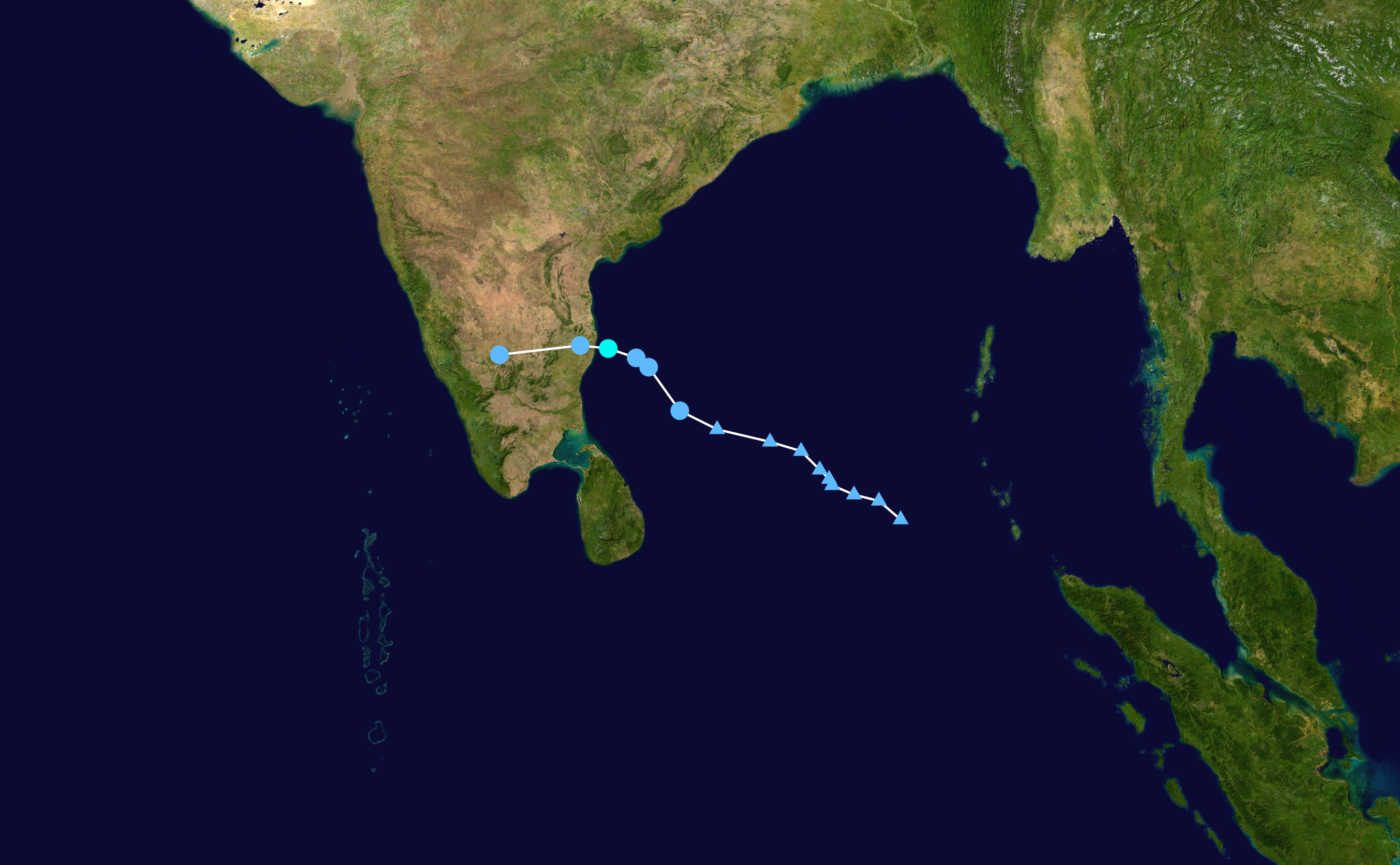
- Duration: November 10 – November 12
- Peak intensity: 45 km/h (30 mph) (3-min); 998 hPa (mbar)

On November 6, the IMD noted the formation of a cyclonic circulation over southeastern Bay of Bengal near Sumatra. Two days later at 13:30 UTC (19:00 IST), the JTWC started tracking the same system as Invest 91B. On November 9, under the influence of the cyclonic circulation, a low-pressure area formed over the same area. On the next day, it was upgraded to a well-marked low pressure area after noting a formation of a defined vortex in associated with the system. At 15:00 UTC (21:30 IST), the IMD further upgraded it to a depression as its convective structure had improved significantly. Later at 19:30 UTC (01:00 IST), the JTWC issued a TCFA for system. At 09:00 UTC of November 11, the JTWC declared it as a tropical cyclone and designated as 04B. However, the system could not further intensify as it was already near to the coast and high wind shear produced by an upper tropospheric ridge. Between 12:00 and 13:00 UTC (17:30 and 18:30 IST), the system made landfall near to Chennai, and by 00:00 UTC (05:30 IST) the next day the system weakened into a well-marked low pressure area. The JTWC issued its final advisory at 15:00 UTC of November 11.

The depression further worsened the floods that occurred in Tamil Nadu and Andhra Pradesh. It took lives of 16 people in India and 25 people in Sri Lanka.

=== Depression BOB 06 ===
- Depression (IMD)
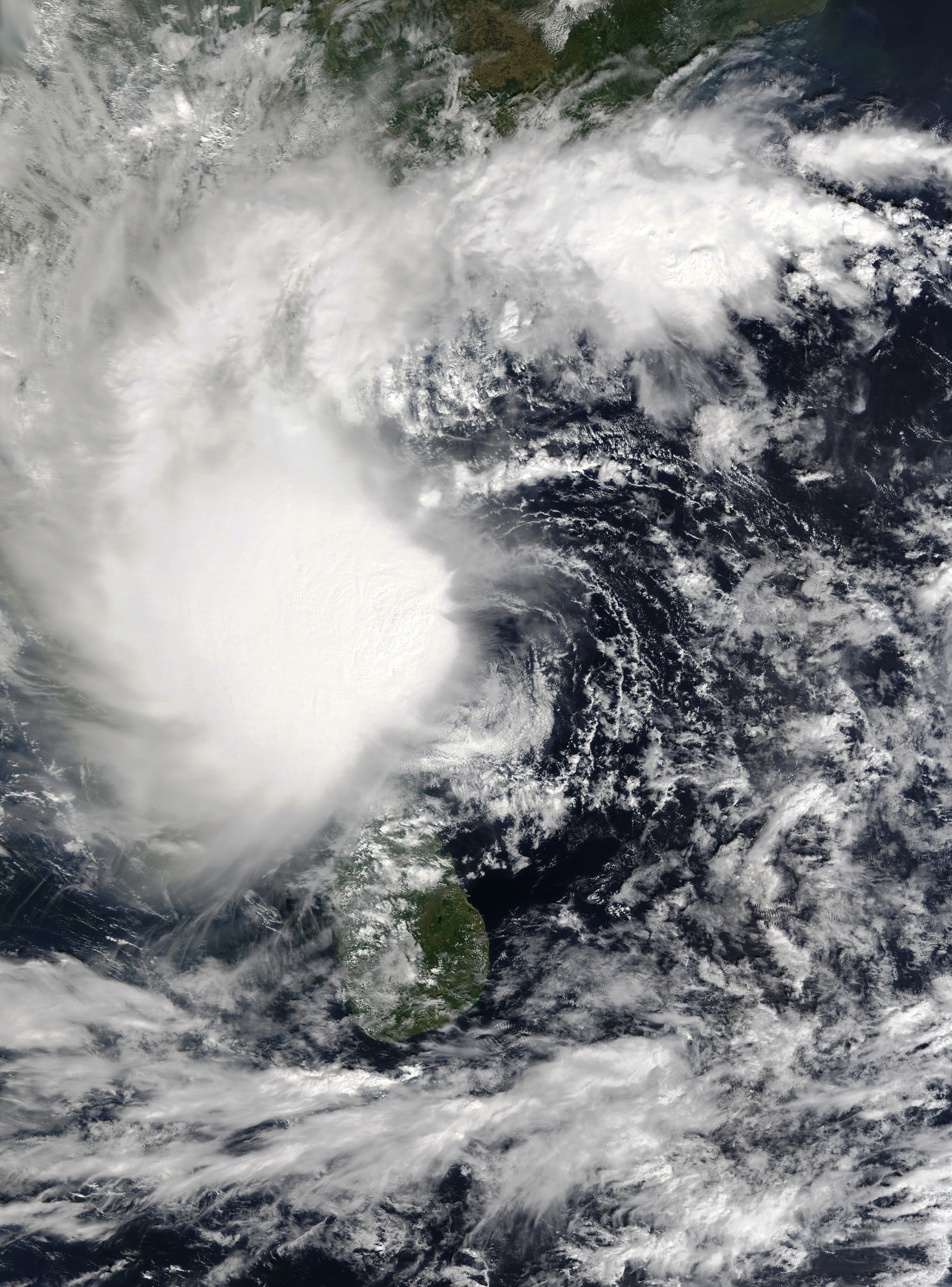
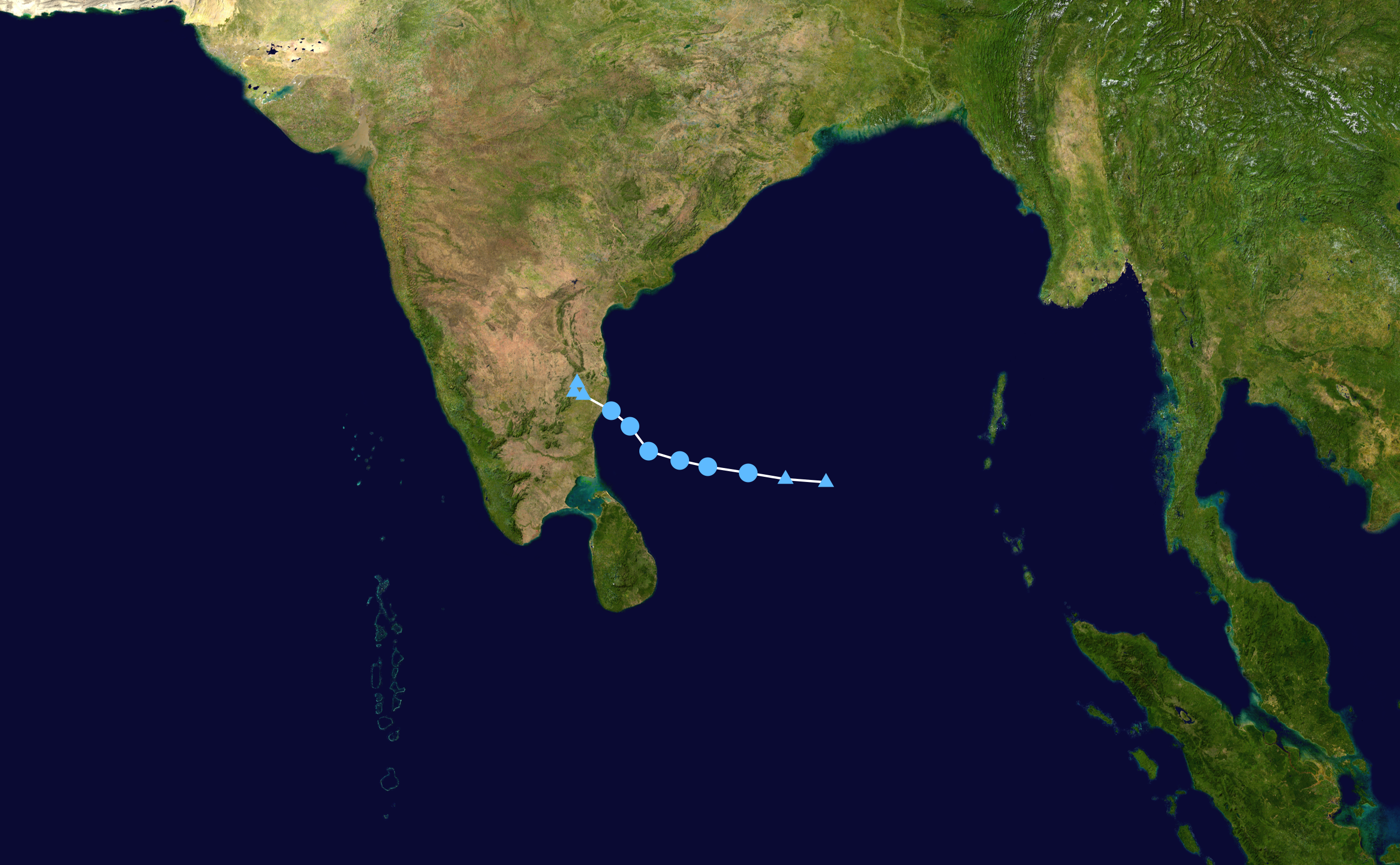
- Duration: November 18 – November 19
- Peak intensity: 45 km/h (30 mph) (3-min); 1000 hPa (mbar)

On November 12, a cyclonic circulation persisted over the Gulf of Thailand and the adjoining Malay Peninsula, which on the next day became a low pressure area by the IMD and Invest 92B by the JTWC. The IMD and the JTWC previously forecasted that it would become a depression by November 15 and further intensify on November 18 as it reaches the coast of Andhra Pradesh. However both the agencies downgraded to nil chance of becoming a depression on November 15, because of a formation of another low pressure system over the Arabian Sea and the formation of a trough to the south of the system over the east of the equatorial Indian Ocean, which blocked the inflow of warm moist winds to the center of the system. As the low pressure area meandered westwards towards the Tamil Nadu coast, the system rapidly intensified into a depression by 07:00 UTC (12:30 IST) of November 18, as its convection rapidly consolidated and formed a distinct low-level center. By the same time, the JTWC issued a TCFA on the system and started to retrack. Between 21:30 and 22:30 UTC (03:00 and 04:00 IST) of the same day, the depression crossed north of Pondicherry, and by 08:00 UTC (13:30 IST) the system weakened into a well-marked low pressure area. The JTWC cancelled the TCFA as it made landfall.

=== Cyclonic Storm Jawad ===
- Cyclonic storm (IMD)
- Tropical storm (SSHWS)
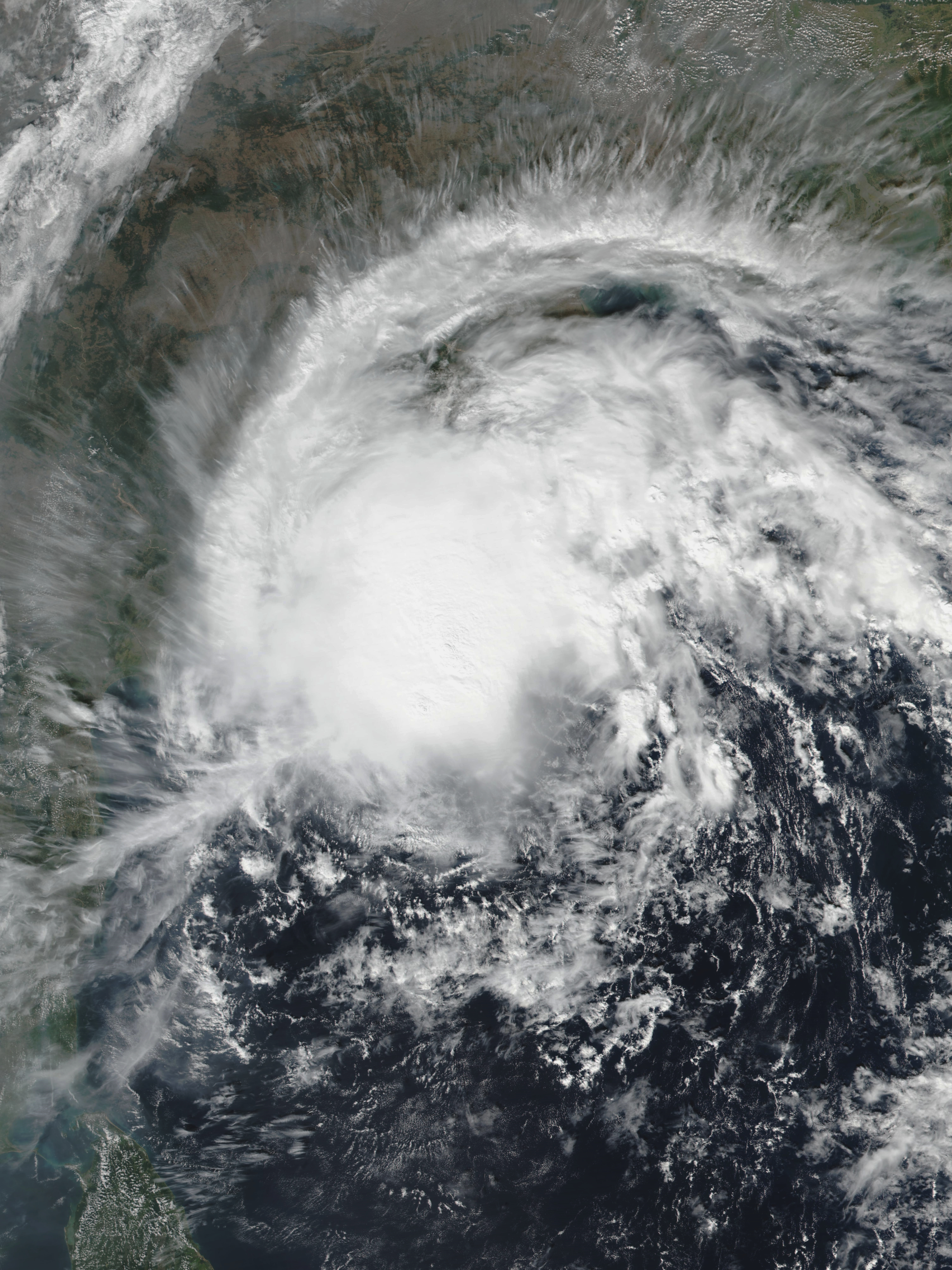
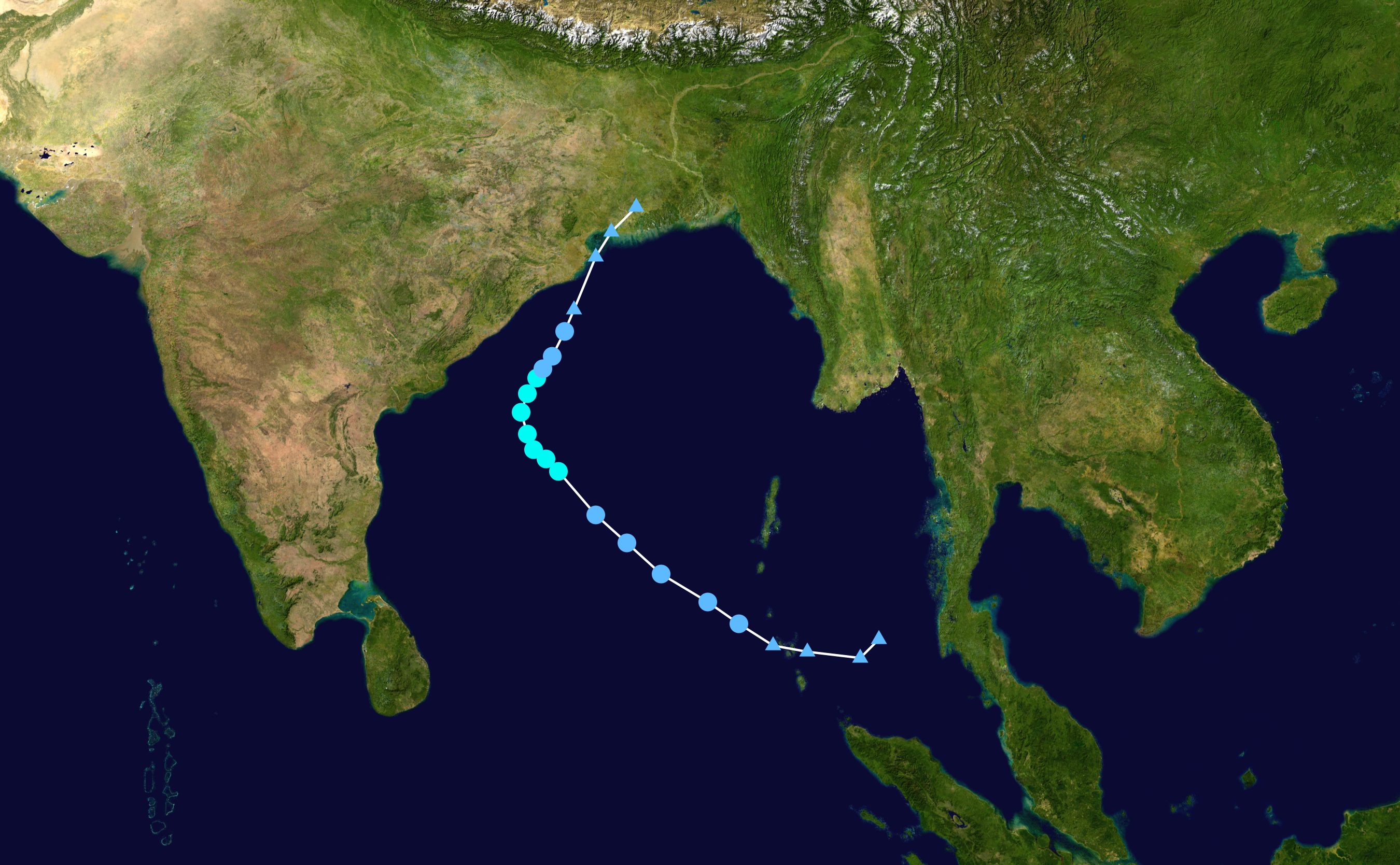
- Duration: December 2 – December 6
- Peak intensity: 75 km/h (45 mph) (3-min); 1000 hPa (mbar)

On November 28, the JTWC and the JMA acknowledged a formation of an area of low pressure, which they dubbed as Invest 94W over the South China Sea, which was located 251 nmi (465 km; 289 mi) from Ho Chi Minh City. Two days later, at 12:00 UTC (17:30 IST) on November 30, the system crossed into the Andaman Sea, and the IMD started to monitor the system as a low-pressure area. On December 2, at 00:00 UTC (05:30 IST), the system further intensified into a well-marked low-pressure area, as the department found that the storm's thunderstorms had been organizing over the past day, with a distinct shear pattern. Shortly afterward, the JTWC issued a TCFA for the system. Later that day, at 12:00 UTC (17:30 IST), the system intensified into a depression, with the IMD designating the system as BOB 07, after the storm's convection organized further. By the next day, at 03:00 UTC (08:30 IST), the system further intensified into a deep depression. At the same time, the JTWC declared it a tropical cyclone, assigning a tropical storm intensity to the system, as the cyclone developed a well-defined mid-level circulation, though its low-level circulation center was displaced to the northwest. Three hours later, the system was upgraded to a cyclonic storm, with IMD assigning the system the name Jawad. (Note: The name Jawad (Arabic: جواد, [d͡ʒawaːd]) was contributed by Saudi Arabia and is a masculine given name meaning "generous" in Arabic.) After 00:00 UTC of December 4, Jawad began weakening after reaching its peak intensity at 12:00 UTC the previous day, and by 12:00 UTC the same day, Jawad lost its organization and the IMD downgraded the storm back into a deep depression, most possibly due to decreasing sea surface temperatures along the storm's track with unfavorable wind shear. This same reasoning was also used by the JTWC in the agency's final warning on the system, three hours earlier. At the same time by the next day, Jawad was further downgraded into a depression as it started to make a northwestward move, and by December 6 at 00:00 UTC, the system further degenerated into a well-marked low-pressure over the northwest Bay of Bengal without making landfall; its convection moved inland over West Bengal and Bangladesh, however.

Since Cyclone Jawad stayed mainly over the sea, it didn't cause any significant damages. However it did take two lives because of a falling coconut tree.

== Storm names ==
Within this basin, a tropical cyclone is assigned a name when it is judged to have reached cyclonic storm intensity with winds of 65 km/h (40 mph). The names were selected by a new list from the Regional Specialized Meteorological Center in New Delhi by mid year of 2020. There is no retirement of tropical cyclone names in this basin as the list of names is only scheduled to be used once before a new list of names is drawn up. Should a named tropical cyclone move into the basin from the Western Pacific, then it will retain its original name. The names which were used for the 2021 season are listed below.

- Tauktae
- Yaas
- Gulab
- Shaheen
- Jawad

== Season effects ==
This is a table of all storms in the 2021 North Indian Ocean cyclone season. It mentions all of the season's storms and their names, duration, peak intensities (according to the IMD storm scale), damage, and death totals. Damage and death totals include the damage and deaths caused when that storm was a precursor wave or extratropical low, and all of the damage figures are in 2021 USD.

Name	Dates	Peak intensity			Areas affected	Damage (USD)	Deaths	Ref(s).
Name	Dates	Category	Wind speed	Pressure	Areas affected	Damage (USD)	Deaths	Ref(s).
BOB 01	April 2 – 3	Depression	45 km/h (30 mph)	1000 hPa (29.53 inHg)	Andaman and Nicobar Islands, Myanmar	None	0	
Tauktae	May 14 – 19	Extremely severe cyclonic storm	185 km/h (115 mph)	950 hPa (28.05 inHg)	Delhi, Madhya Pradesh, Maharashtra, Karnataka, Kerala, Goa, Lakshadweep, Maldives, Rajasthan, Uttarakhand, Uttar Pradesh, Sindh, Sri Lanka, West India, Gujarat	$2.25 billion	174	
Yaas	May 23 – 28	Very severe cyclonic storm	140 km/h (85 mph)	970 hPa (28.64 inHg)	Andaman and Nicobar Islands, Bangladesh, East India, Nepal, Uttar Pradesh	$2.99 billion	20	
BOB 03	September 12 – 15	Deep depression	55 km/h (35 mph)	990 hPa (29.23 inHg)	Central India, Gujarat, Maharashtra, Odisha, West Bengal	Unknown	3	
Gulab	September 24 – 28	Cyclonic storm	85 km/h (50 mph)	992 hPa (29.29 inHg)	Andhra Pradesh, Chhattisgarh, Maharashtra, Odisha, Telangana	$271 million	20	
Shaheen	September 30 – October 4	Severe cyclonic storm	110 km/h (70 mph)	984 hPa (29.06 inHg)	Balochistan, Iran, Gujarat, Oman, Saudi Arabia, Sindh, United Arab Emirates, Yemen	$520 million	14	
ARB 03	November 7 – 9	Depression	45 km/h (30 mph)	1002 hPa (29.59 inHg)	Lakshadweep	None	0	
BOB 05	November 10 – 12	Depression	45 km/h (30 mph)	998 hPa (29.47 inHg)	Andhra Pradesh, Tamil Nadu, Kerala, Sri Lanka	Unknown	41	
BOB 06	November 18 – 19	Depression	45 km/h (30 mph)	1000 hPa (29.53 inHg)	Tamil Nadu	None	0	
Jawad	December 2 – 6	Cyclonic storm	75 km/h (45 mph)	1000 hPa (29.53 inHg)	Andaman and Nicobar Islands, Andhra Pradesh, Odisha, West Bengal	$50.4 million	2	
Season aggregates
10 systems	April 2 – December 6		185 km/h (115 mph)	950 hPa (28.05 inHg)		$6.08 billion	274	

== See also ==
- Weather of 2021
- Tropical cyclones in 2021
- North Indian Ocean cyclone season
- 2021 Atlantic hurricane season
- 2021 Pacific hurricane season
- 2021 Pacific typhoon season
- South-West Indian Ocean cyclone seasons: 2020–21, 2021–22
- Australian region cyclone seasons: 2020–21, 2021–22
- South Pacific cyclone seasons: 2020–21, 2021–22
