= Weather of 2015 =

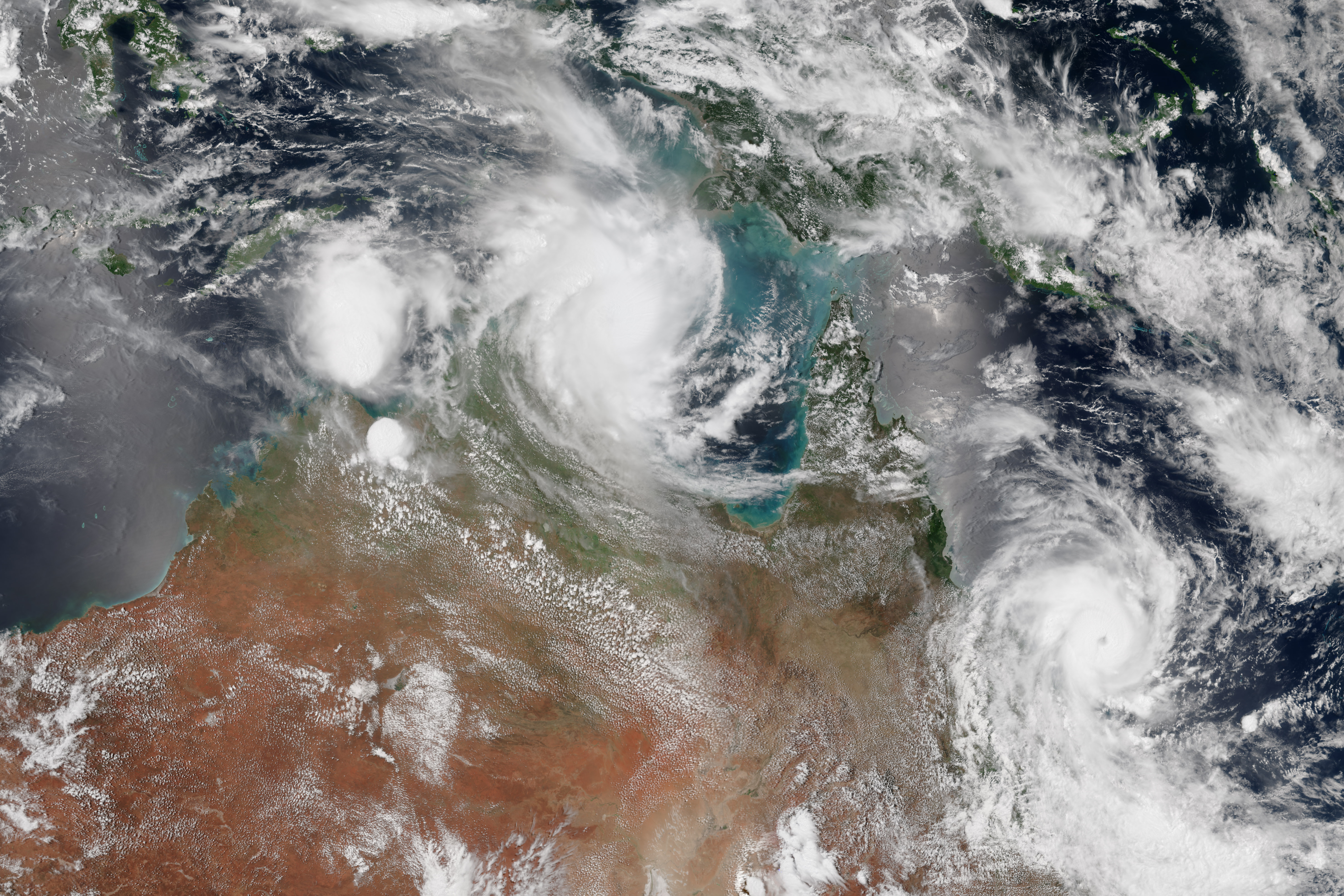
Satellite image of tropical cyclones Lam (top-center) and Marcia (right), which marked the first instance of two tropical cyclones hitting Australia in a 24 hour period in February 2015

The following is a list of weather events that occurred on Earth in 2015. There were several natural disasters around the world from various types of weather, including blizzards, cold waves, droughts, heat waves, tornadoes, and tropical cyclones.

Some of the deadliest weather events were a pair of heat waves affecting India and Pakistan which together killed around 4,500 people. Also in Asia, Cyclone Komen in July killed 187 people. A series of monsoonal floods in India killed 470 people in the last three months of the year. In October, heavy rainfall in Guatemala triggered a major landslide in a village near Guatemala City, killing at least 280 people. The costliest single weather event of the year was Typhoon Mujigae, which left ¥27 billion (US$4.3 billion) in damage and caused 27 deaths in southern China. In October, Hurricane Patricia became the strongest tropical cyclone ever recorded in the Western Hemisphere, when it attained 1 minute sustained winds of 215 mph (345 km/h) and a minimum pressure of 872 mbar (25.8 inHg) off the west coast of Mexico.

== Winter storms and cold waves ==
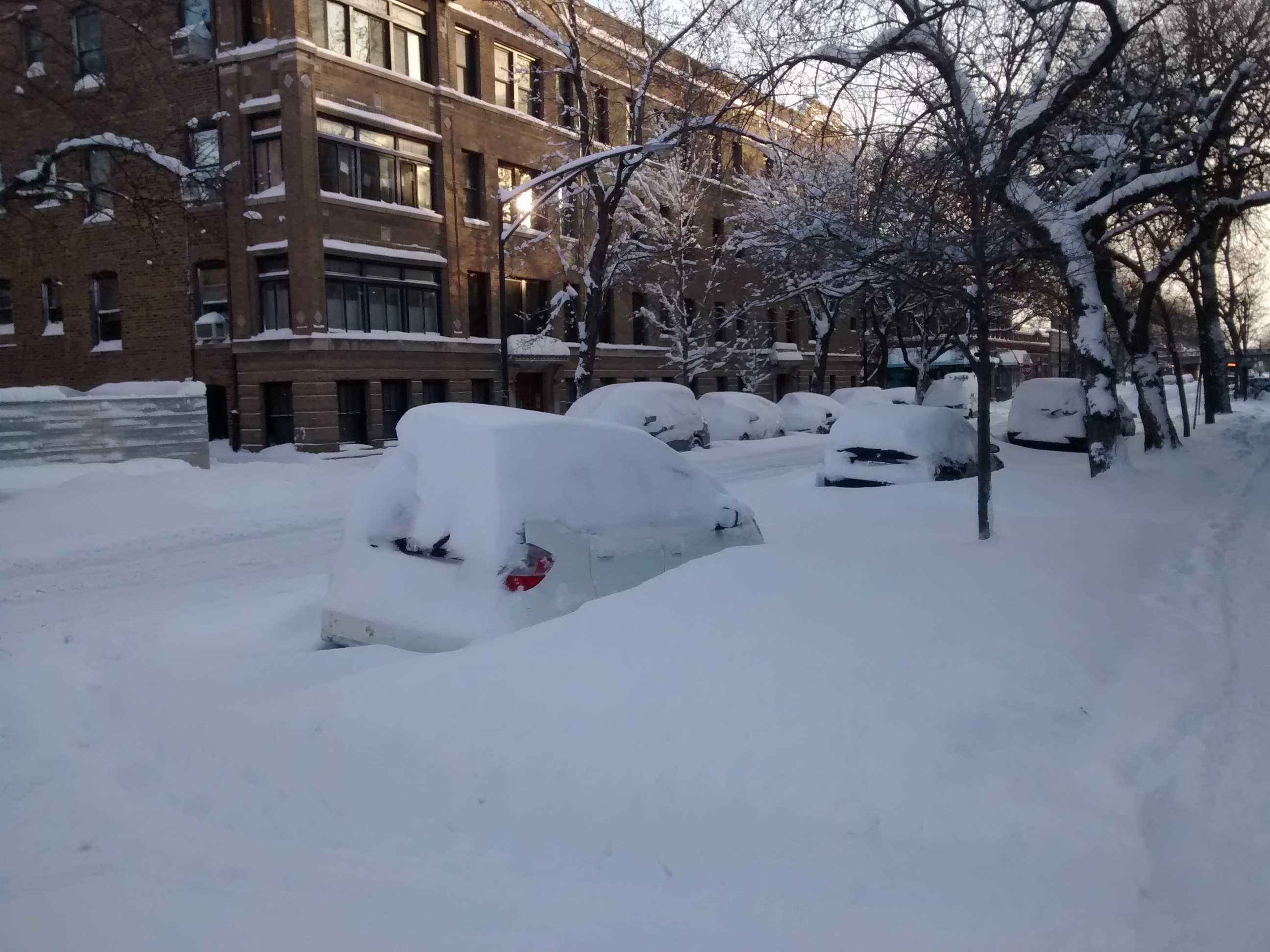
Snow-covered cars in Chicago

In February, blizzard and avalanches killed more than 300 people in Afghanistan. Also in February, a blizzard affected much of North America amid a cold wave, killing 30 people and leaving US$3.5 billion in damage.

== Droughts, heat waves, and wildfires ==
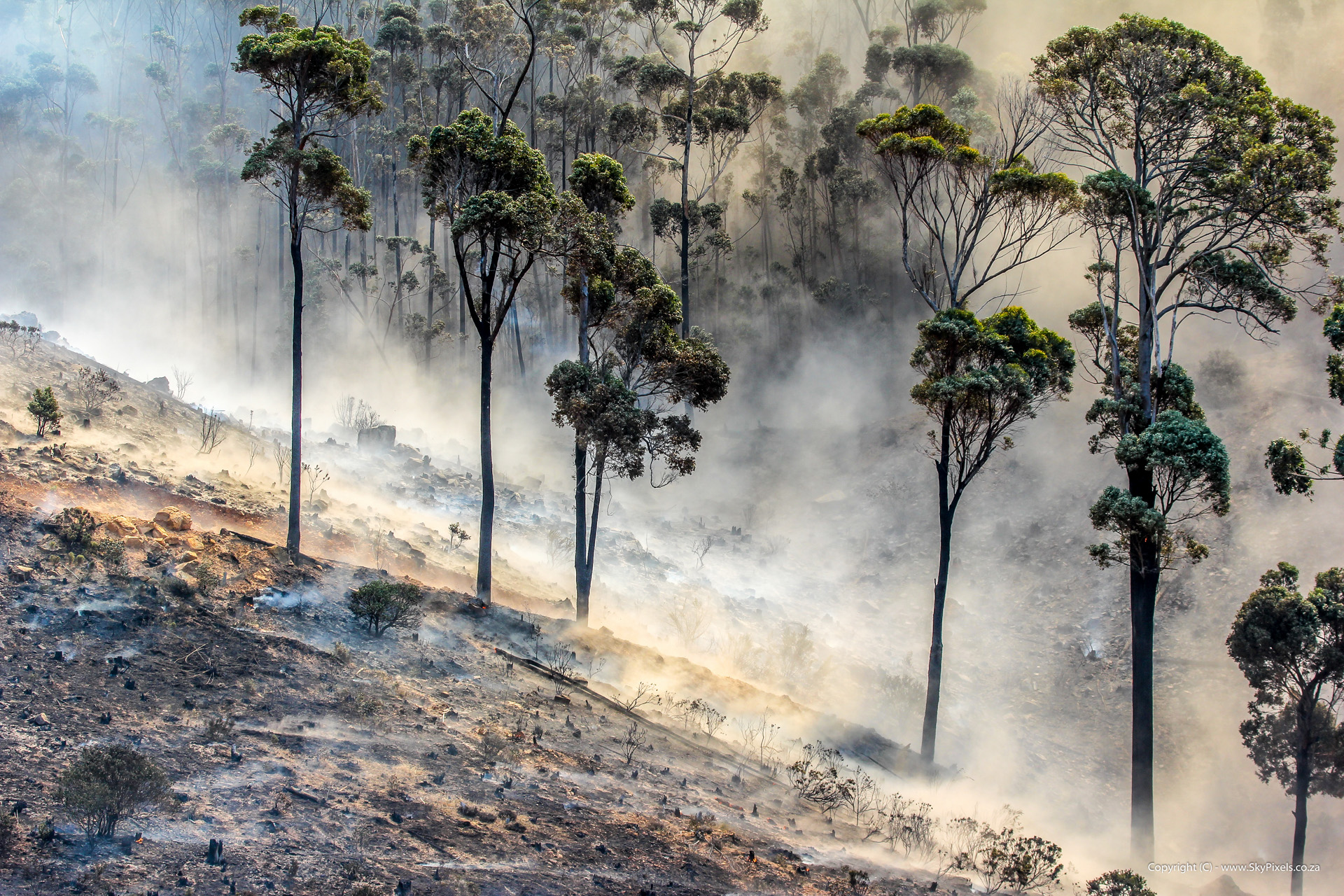
Wildfires in Cape Town, South Africa

From February to April, South Africa experienced wildfires. In April, wildfires in Russia killed 33 people. The yearly wildfires in the state of California killed nine people and left more than US$4.7 billion in damage. The yearly wildfires in the state of Washington was the largest in state history, with more than one million acres (400,000 ha; 1,600 sq mi) burning across the state from June to September. In November, wildfires in Western Australia killed four people.

In May, a heat wave in India killed at least 2,500 people. A month later, a heat wave in neighboring Pakistan killed about 2,000 people.

Drought across the western United States throughout the year caused more than US$5 billion in damage, mostly related to agriculture losses.

== Floods ==
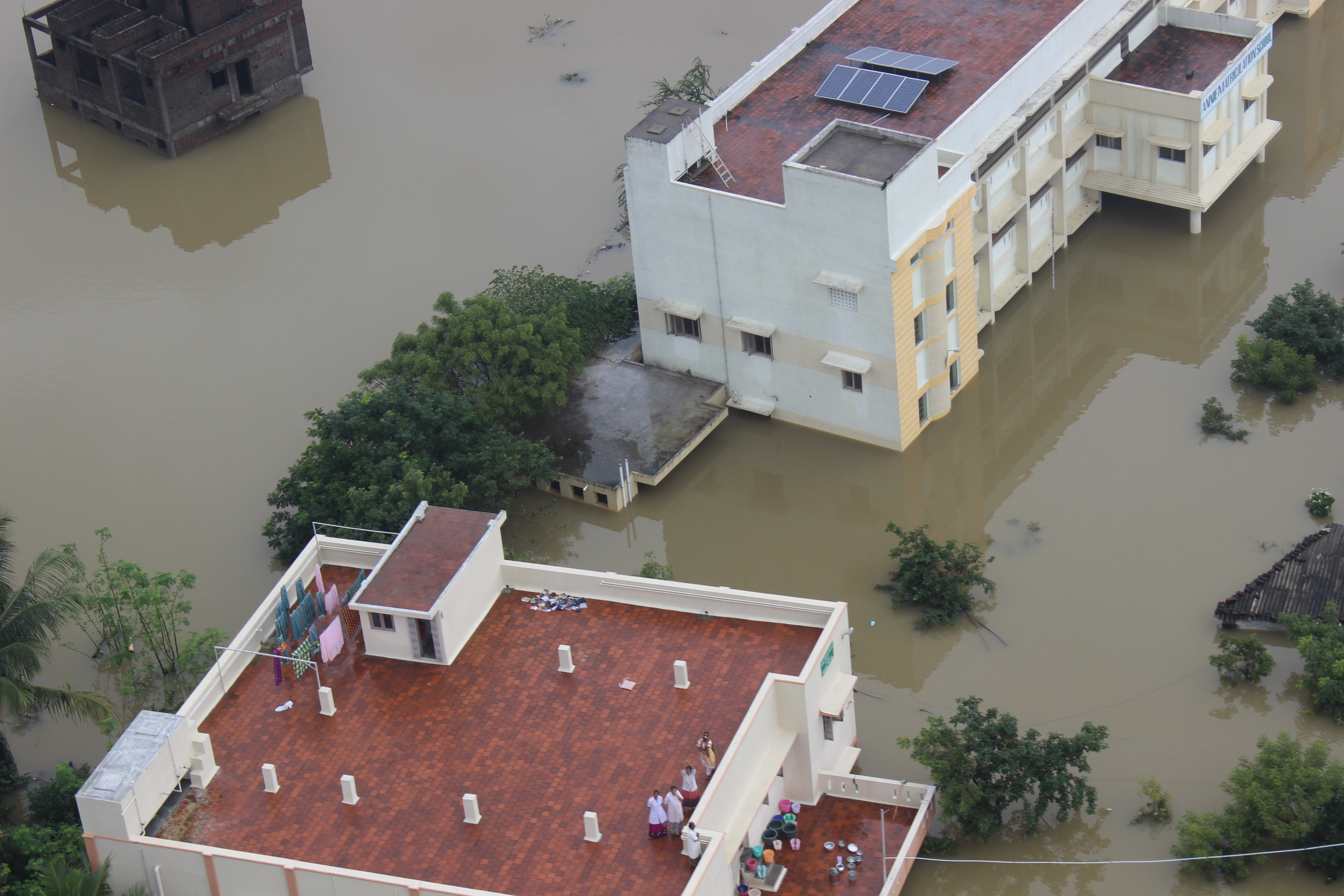
Aerial view of floods in southern India in Chennai

In January, floods in southeastern Africa killed more than 214 people in Malawi and Mozambique. In March, floods in Chile killed 25 people, and forced 3,000 people to stay in emergency shelters. Also in the month, floods in Tanzania killed 50 people. In April, a landslide in Salvador, Brazil killed at least 14 people. Also in the month, snowmelt triggered a landslide in Afghanistan, killing 52 people. In May, heavy rainfall triggered a landslide in Salgar, Colombia, killing 83 people. In June, floods in the country of Georgia killed 20 people. Also in June, heavy rainfall caused floods in Accra, the capital of the African nation of Ghana; the floods killed at least 25 people, while a petrol station explosion caused by the flooding killed at least 200 more people. In July, floods in Gujarat in western India killed 71 people and more than 81,000 cattle. Monsoon floods in India from October to December killed at least 470 people. In October, heavy rainfall in Guatemala triggered a major landslide in a village near Guatemala City, killing at least 280 people. Also in October, a cold front drew moisture from Hurricane Joaquin to produce floods across the eastern United States, killing 25 people and causing US$2.4 billion in damage.

=== Louisiana floods ===
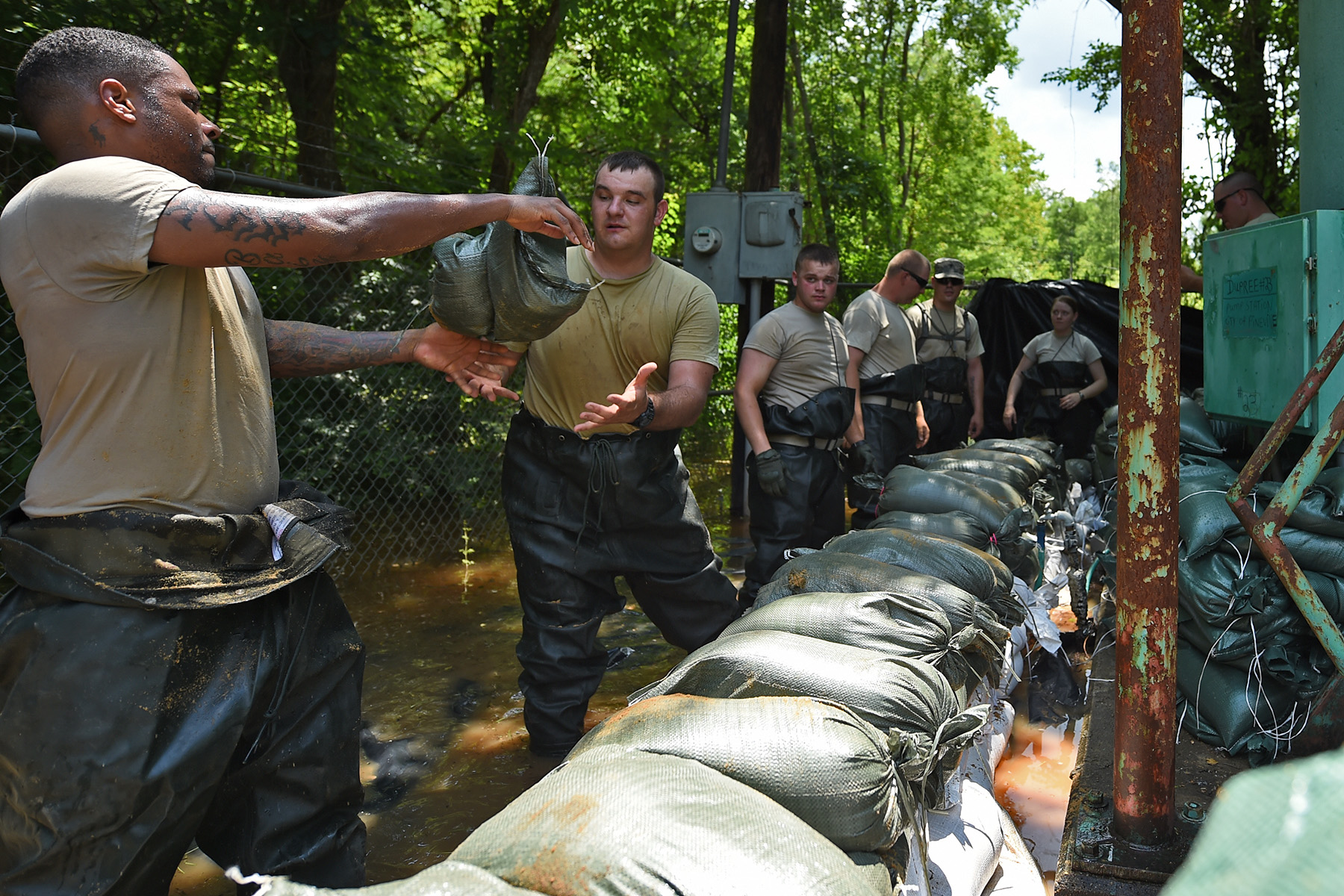
2015 Louisiana floods

The 2015 Louisiana flood took place in the United States for several weeks in June 2015. The areas in Louisiana affected by the Red River flood included Caddo Parish, Bossier Parish, Natchitoches Parish, Rapides Parish, and the cities of Coushatta, Alexandria, and Shreveport. The flood caused numerous road closures throughout Shreveport. Response teams such as the Louisiana National Guard were deployed in order to fill and place sandbags at residences that were under flood warning.

The Red River reached its highest level in over 70 years, cresting in most of the affected areas at around 6–9 feet over the flood levels. At 4 PM on June 9, the river reached its maximum height of 37.14 feet.

The most recent US Army Corps of Engineers study to characterize the flood patterns of the Red River was released in 1990, when the river last flooded. There are no current plans for another study.

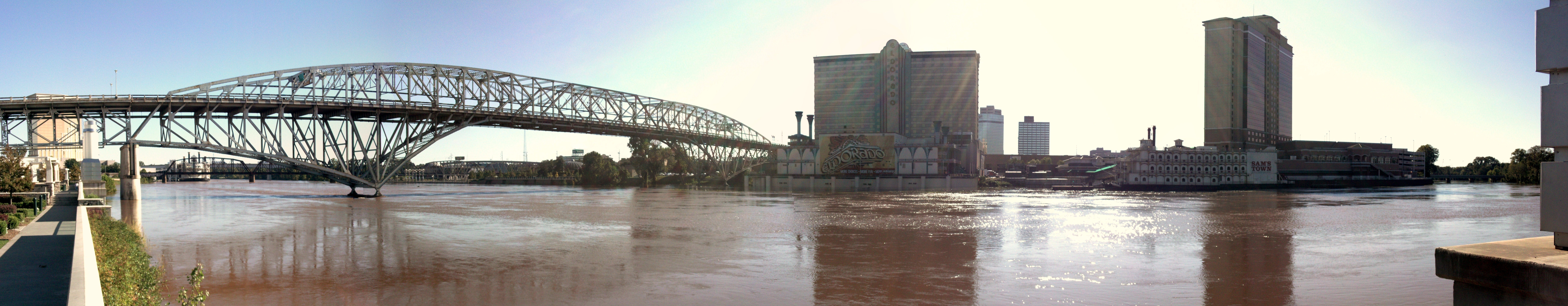
The Red River. Shreveport, Louisiana

Although many advances have been made towards flood protection in Louisiana, flooding is inevitable; the changing course of the river(s) will continue no matter how high the levees are built. The Mississippi River flood history shows that the river has a pattern of major flooding once every decade or so.

== Tornadoes ==
During the year, there were at least 1,178 tornadoes in the United States, which resulted in 36 fatalities.

In April, a tornado killed three people in Myanmar. A tornado outbreak in Pakistan killed 45 people. Also in April, a tornado in Brazil killed two people. In addition, the 2015 Rochelle–Fairdale, Illinois tornado caused 2 deaths, 19 injuries and $11 million across central Illinois. Finally in April, a tornado in Pakistan causes 45 deaths. An outbreak in May killed at least five people and left US$1.5 billion in damage. Also in May, a tornado in Mexico, part of the 2015 Texas-Oklahoma flood and tornado outbreak, killed 14 people. As a result of the storm's damaging effects, 45 people were killed and over 200 were wounded. In July, a tornado in Italy killed one person. In late December, a tornado outbreak produced an EF4 tornado in Holly Springs, Mississippi with winds of 170 mph (270 km/h), causing 9 deaths.

== Tropical cyclones ==
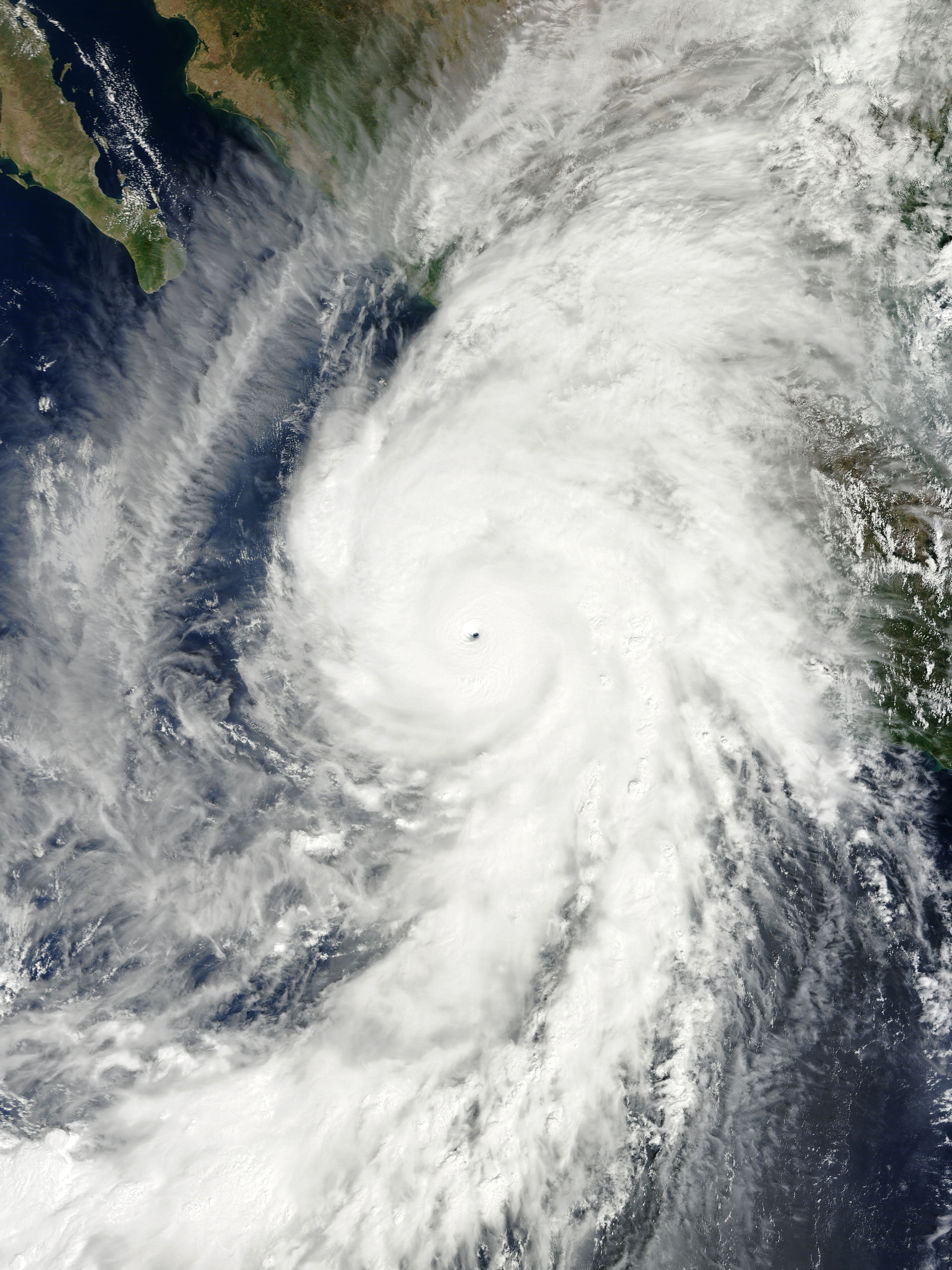
Satellite image of Hurricane Patricia off the southwest coast of Mexico as the strongest tropical cyclone in the Western Hemisphere

As the year began, Tropical Storm Jangmi was dissipating in the South China Sea. There were 12 tropical cyclones in the year in the south-west Indian Ocean, including very intense tropical cyclones Bansi and Eunice, which both attained 10 minute sustained winds of at least 220 km/h (140 mph) in January. Also in the month, Tropical Storm Chedza moved across Madagascar, killing 80 people, mostly due to landslides. In the Australian region, there were 17 tropical cyclones. In February, two cyclones – Lam and Marcia made landfall in Australia in a 24 hour period, the first ever recorded instance of such an occurrence. Lam moved ashore Northern Australia, causing widespread flooding. Six hours later, Marcia made landfall on Queensland as a Category 5 severe tropical cyclone, causing A$750 million (US$587 million) in damage. There were 18 tropical cyclones in the South Pacific, including Cyclone Pam in March, which moved through Vanuatu with winds of 250 km/h (155 mph), causing 16 deaths and VT63.2 billion (US$600 million) in damage. There were also two subtropical cyclones in the South Atlantic Ocean, Bapo and Cari.

In the north-west Pacific Ocean, there were 38 tropical cyclones during the year. Its strongest was Typhoon Soudelor in August, with 10 minute sustained winds of 215 km/h (130 mph). Soudelor struck the Northern Mariana Islands, Taiwan and southeastern China, resulting in 59 deaths and over US$4 billion in damage. Also in August, Typhoon Goni killed 74 people and caused more than US$1 billion in damage. In October, Typhoon Mujigae hit Guangdong in southern China with 10 minute winds of 155 km/h (100 mph), the strongest recorded landfall in the country in the month. The typhoon caused ¥27 billion (US$4.3 billion) in damage and 27 deaths in China. In the north Indian Ocean, there were 12 tropical cyclones, including Cyclone Chapala, the strongest recorded cyclone to strike Yemen, which hit during the country's civil war. A week later, the cyclone was followed by Cyclone Megh, which killed 18 people on Socotra island. In June, a depression in western India killed 81 people and caused widespread floods. Also during the season, Cyclone Komen meandered over the northern Bay of Bengal, resulting in 187 deaths and US$2 billion in damage.

In the north-east Pacific Ocean, there were 31 tropical cyclones, half of which intensified into hurricanes. The strongest storm of the season was Hurricane Patricia, which on October 23 attained 1 minute sustained winds of 215 mph (345 km/h) and a minimum pressure of 872 mbar (25.8 inHg), making it the most intense tropical cyclone ever recorded in the western hemisphere, and the second-strongest worldwide after Typhoon Tip in 1979. Patricia struck southwestern Mexico after weakening, causing at least two deaths and US$325 million in damage. The Atlantic hurricane season was quiet by contrast, with just 12 tropical cyclones. The strongest was Hurricane Joaquin, which hit the Bahamas in October with 1 minute sustained winds of 130 mph (215 km/h). Damage in the country was estimated at US$200 million. Joaquin also capsized the cargo ship SS El Faro, killing the crew of 33 people. Also during the season, Tropical Storm Erika produced flooding and landslides in Dominica when it moved through the Lesser Antilles in August, killing 30 people and causing US$482.8 million on the island.

Global weather by year
Preceded by 2014	Weather of 2015	Succeeded by 2016
