= Morari Bapu =

Indian spiritual leader

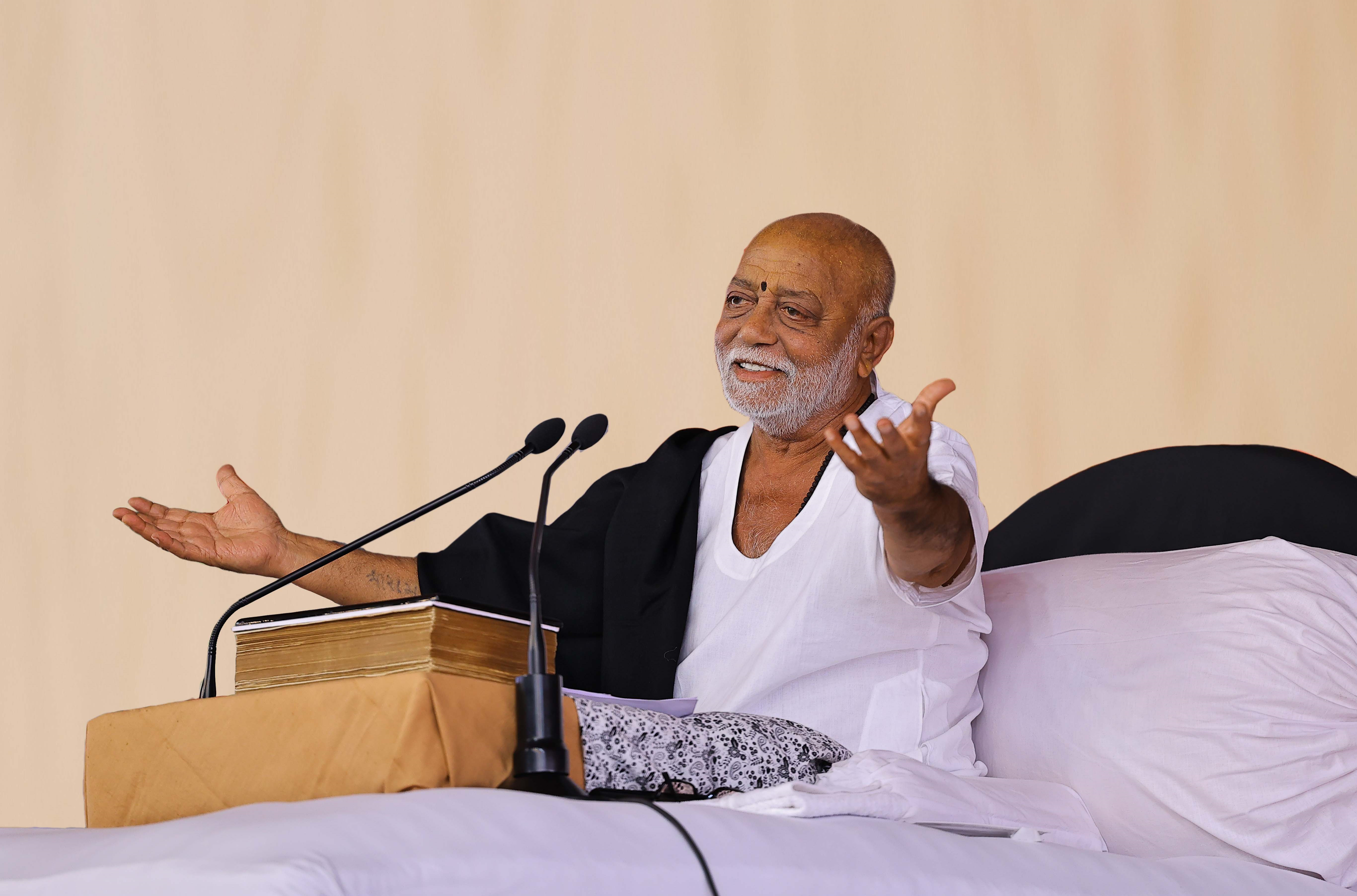
- Born: Morari Bapu; 2 March 1946 (age 80); Talgajarda, Bhavnagar, Gujarat, India
- Citizenship: Indian
- Occupations: Reciter, Ram Charit Manas
- Spouse: Narmadaben Hariyani
- Children: 4
- Website: chitrakutdhamtalgajarda.org

Morari Bapu (born Moraridas Prabhudas Hariyani, 2 March 1946) is an Indian spiritual leader and narrator of Rama katha from Gujarat. He is an exponent of Ramcharitmanas with more than 900 kathas recited over the last 60 years.

== Early life ==
Morari Bapu was born on 2 March 1946 (Maha Shivaratri according to the Hindu calendar) in Talgajarda village in Bhavnagar district, Gujarat, to Prabhudas Hariyani and Savitriben Hariyani, in a family of six brothers and two sisters. His family followed Nimbarka Sampradaya, a Hindu Vaishnava tradition. Morari Bapu studied the Ramcharitmanas from his grandfather. Tribhuvandas Bapu's younger brother, Vishnu Devanand Giri, was the 6th Mahamandaleshwar of Kailash Ashram, Rishikesh, Haridwar, Uttarakhand (India).

Tribhuvandas, grandfather and guru of Bapu, taught him the deeper meanings of Goswami Tulsidas's Ramcharitmanas and initiated him on the path of recitation of the sacred text, i.e., the narration of katha. Bapu recited the Ramcharitmanas Chaupais (stanzas or couplets) while walking to and from school, and thus began his journey of oration.

After completing secondary education, Bapu joined the Shahpur Teacher's Training College in Junagadh. In 1966, Bapu started teaching at a primary school in Mahuva.

=== Lineage ===
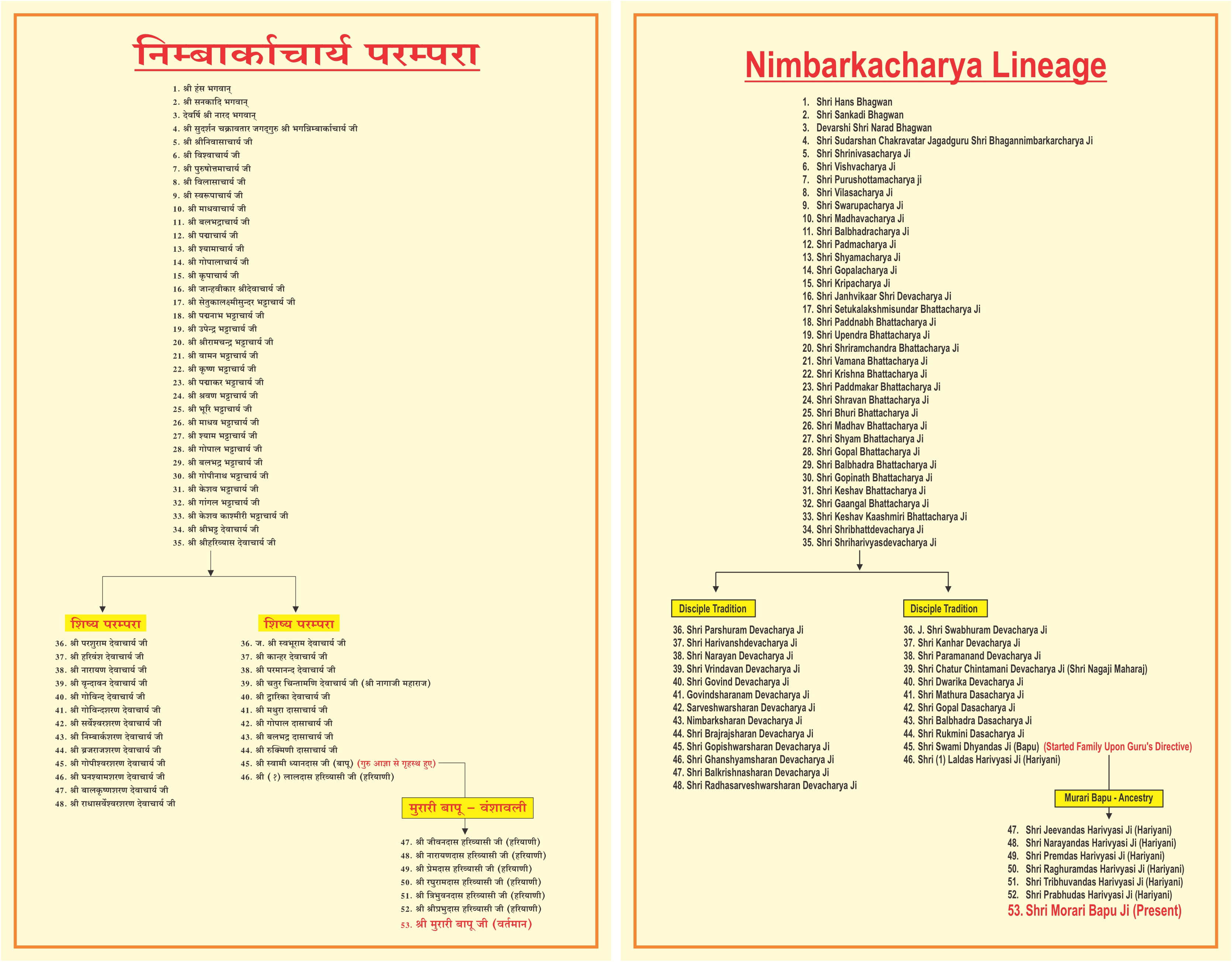
Nimbarkiya Lineage

Dhyanswami Bapa, a followers of Nimbarka Sampradaya, entered Jeevant Samadhi (live burial) at Senjal Dham of Mahuva. Dhyanswami Bapa's disciple, Jeevandas Bapa got married, and in his lineage Bapu was born.

== Career ==
When Bapu was 14 years old, he began reciting Ram Katha under the guidance and encouragement of his grandfather and spiritual mentor, Tribhuvandas Bapu. Initially, he would recite verses from the Ramcharitmanas to a small group of people under a banyan tree named Tribhuvan Vat, named after his grandfather, mentor, and guru in his village. As time went on, he began to recite at the Ram Temple in both his village, Talgajarda, and the nearby town of Mahuva.

Bapu's first 9-day katha outside of Talgajarda was in 1966 at Ramfaldas Maharaj's ashram in Ganthila village, Gujarat. He gave his first discourse abroad in Nairobi, Kenya in 1976. Kathas based in Gujarat are narrated in Gujarati, and in the rest of India and abroad, in Hindi.

Bapu has also narrated the 19 verses of the Gopi Geet as Manas Gopi Geet.

Bapu's Ram Kathas can be seen on the Aastha TV network and the Chitrakutdham Talgajarda YouTube channel. The largest gathering at one of Bapu's Ram Kathas to date has been 1.2 million people over the course of nine days in Nathdwara, Rajasthan (India).

Bapu has traversed major areas and pilgrimages in India, including Amarnath, Vaishno Devi, Gangotri, Yamunotri, Kedarnath, Badrinath, Kurukshetra, Vraj Chaurasi, Varanasi, Prayagraj, Hastinapur, Naimisharanya, Ujjain, Omkareshwar, Bet Dwarka, Bodh Gaya, Jagannath Puri, Dhanushkodi, Rameshwaram, Somnath, Vaishno Devi, Ambaji and Ayodhya. Some overseas Kathas would include Toronto, Atlanta, Panama, Amazon rainforest, London, Paris, Switzerland, Vatican City, Athens, South Africa, Mauritius, Jordan, Abu Dhabi, Dubai, Rakshastal, Kailash, Bhushundi Sarovar, Moscow, Cambodia, Malaysia, Singapore, Bali, Hiroshima, Sydney and New Zealand. Bapu's other unique Kathas include – A Katha on board a cruise ship and on board a flight; Katha in the Cambridge University Campus having UK Prime minister Rishi Sunak attend on 77th Indian Independence Day and greeted the audience with Jai Siya Ram; A 12 Jyotirlings Katha journey of 12000 km by train in 18 days from Kedarnath to Somnath; A Katha at Ayodhya to celebrate Ram Temple Consecration ceremony.

Bapu does not charge for his recitations of Ram Katha. His sermons are open to everyone without financial or other restrictions, regardless of age, gender, caste, creed, or social status.

== Spiritual views and Teachings ==
Bapu's overall ethos of katha is universal peace by reciting nine-day discourses, spreading the message of truth (satya), love (prem), and compassion (karuna), and relating the Ramcharitmanas scripture to everyday lives, embedding spirituality rather than religion.

Bapu defines religion as truth, love, and compassion. According to him, the conventional idea of being religious is confined to going to temples or churches and observing fasts, but the idea of religion as truth, love, and compassion goes beyond the boundaries of countries and continents.

Bapu's line of thought is “not to improve, but to accept all”. Bapu does not see those who listen to or attend the Ram Kathas as his followers. Instead, he calls them "flowers".

Bapu spreads awareness about the essentials of life, which captures the interest of numerous young individuals who are also drawn to attend katha. People should come out of the mental crises of jealousy (Īrṣyā), backbiting and criticism (ninda) and hatred (dvesh).

Bapu supports environment-related causes. Cows should be nurtured and worshipped, not harmed. Bapu believes in ‘Pravahi Parampara’ (flowing tradition). He has been speaking for progressive norms in the 21st century and feels there should be no stagnancy in religious beliefs.

Bapu says that the Ramcharitmanas is meant for the welfare and development of every living being.

Bapu has faith in the five elements (Pancha tattva) philosophy. As per him, the five cardinal elements of Sanatan Dharma are: Bhagavan Ganesha, Bhagavan Rama, Bhagavan Krishna, Bhagavan Shiva, Goddess Durga (representing all goddesses). And all philosophy is contained in the Vedas, the Upanishads, the Puranas, the Bhagvad Gita and the Ramayana.

Bapu celebrates and espouses the importance of Sanatan Dharma festivals like Diwali, Janmashtami, Ram Navami, Shravan Maas and Navratri and encourages vegetarianism and keeping the Holy Basil Plant (Tulsi) in homes.

Morari Bapu himself follows the tradition of bhiksha, a sacred ritual in the Sanatan Dharma of accepting food as alms without any personal choices and eating whatever is served.

== Philanthropy ==
- Medical Aid/Support: Bapu believes in Humanitarian Aid (Manav Seva) and has recited many Kathas to support medical facilities in India:
- Manas Dharam was conducted for Kidney patients - Institute of Kidney Diseases and Research Centre (IKRDC) and Dr H.L. Trivedi Institute of Transplantation Sciences (ITS), Ahmedabad, Gujarat in 2015.
- Manas Cancer was conducted for “Fight for Cancer” - Gujarat Cancer Society, Ahmedabad, Gujarat in 2012. (Approx ₹3 crore raised and donated).
- Manas Seva Yagna was conducted for "cost-free hospital" - Shree Lallubhai Sheth Arogya Mandir in Savarkundla, Gujarat in 2017.
- Manas Ram Janam ke Hetu Aneka was conducted for “Treatment for Cancer Patients” - Nargis Dutt Foundation, Mumbai in 2018.
- Indian Army: Bapu has always supported the soldiers of India during his various kathas and speeches. He has visited them a couple of times at Wagha, Ferozepur, Amarnath and many other Indian borders. Bapu has also made donations for the soldiers martyred during the Galwan Valley encounter in 2020.
- Manas Shaheed, Surat in 2017, was conducted for the Indian army to raise funds for veterans and their families, to support the families of deceased army personnel in the conflict which also raised awareness across the globe.
- Bapu announced an aid of ₹1 lakh to the family of each Central Reserve Police Force personnel killed in the 2019 Pulwama attack.
- Sex Workers (Prostitutes): Bapu was the first spiritual leader to meet the sex workers in Kamathipura, Mumbai. In December 2018, Manas Ganika Ram katha was conducted in the holy city of Ayodhya for these sex workers. The message here was to give dignity to the neglected, exploited and marginalised segments of the society. As a father figure would, Bapu announced to facilitate sex workers and their children who would want to join the main stream. In this Katha, Bapu pledged ₹3 crore for the welfare of sex workers. At the end ₹6.92 crore was distributed which was more than double of the pledged amount. Morari Bapu addressed a deprived section of society and cited that Rama's life was based on acceptance and reforms.
- Transgender people: In December 2016, Manas Kinnar was held in Mumbai for transgender people, to get communities to accept and acknowledge them for who they are.
- For this work, Laxmi Narayan Tripathi, an Indian LGBT activist, had said, "No spiritual or religious leader in the world has ever done this kind of a community event for us and for that, I'm grateful to him".
- Dalits: In October 2019, Manas Harijan was held in Delhi for Dalit Community. Bapu gave the meaning of Harijan (Hari – Jan) People of God and also visited many Dalit family homes.
- Cows: Bapu has advocated for the care of cows and the establishment of gaushalas. Upon desire by The President of India to Bapu, "Gir" cattle were sent to Rashtrapati Bhavan. Around 1975, Bapu along with Shri Vinoba Bhave requested to close slaughterhouses to save cows.
- In 2012, Manas Surdhenu was recited in Govardhan and raised and donated approximately ₹3 crore for the welfare of cows.
- Nature: Bapu appeals for mass tree plantation drives. Bapu supports sanitation campaigns and encourages avoiding the single use of plastic bags to preserve nature. Bapu also recited a katha for the construction of public toilets in Bardoli in 2005.
- Temples: Morari Bapu supported the construction of the Ram Janmabhoomi Temple on the disputed site in Ayodhya. In the TV show, Aap Ki Adalat, he appealed to the Hon. Supreme Court of India not to delay the judgement regarding the temple. In this same episode, he said that nobody can question the patriotism of Narendra Modi. When the Supreme Court announced the verdict, Morari Bapu welcomed it as fair and balanced. In July 2020, during his discourse at Pithoria Dham located near his village, Morari Bapu announced ₹5 crore (US$700,000) donation for the construction of Ram Janmabhoomi Temple and urged his Flowers (Katha listeners) to contribute as well. Bapu ended up becoming the highest donor contributing around ₹19 crore (US$2.5 million) with his flowers.
- Natural Disasters (Floods, Cyclone, Nuclear Leak, Drought, Earthquake): Bapu has contributed and encouraged others to provide aid and support at times of tragedy in India and abroad. A few examples of where Bapu facilitated aid are Gujarat floods, Uttarakhand floods (Ram katha has contributed around ₹10 crore to Uttarakhand floods and re-construction of the Kedarnath temple in 2014, Cyclone Idai (South Africa), Cyclone Tauktae (Gujarat), Cyclone Yaas (Odisha), Fukushima nuclear leak (Japan). Bapu recited a Ram Katha in Jaipur, Rajasthan during the 2003 drought and J&K floods. Raised and donated approximately ₹5 crore to support gaushalas through the Governor Relief Fund. Bapu raised and donated approximately ₹15 crore towards the Kutch earthquake 2001.
- COVID-19 Pandemic: During the early days of the COVID-19 pandemic, Bapu conducted a Hari Katha for a period of 61 days without any live audience in attendance.
- Art and Culture: Bapu has hosted writers and poets from all over India to discuss literary and scholarly developments during a programme like Asmita Parva as part of the Hanuman Jayanti celebrations that take place every year. Bapu has also hosted scholars of the most ancient language, Sanskrit, as well as other artists. Bapu invites well-known Indian musicians and singers to perform during the evening festivities.
- Multiple Weddings (Samuh Lagna): Bapu facilitates "Samuh Lagna" (an occasion where multiple marriages take place together) every year for the needy in Senjal Dham and Talgajarda in Gujarat. In Akshayvat Katha Bapu facilitated 95 couples getting married on 8th day of Ram Katha in Prayagraj, Uttar Pradesh in March 2020 (which also included a couple from sex workers community as well).
- Prisoners: On humanitarian grounds Bapu visited jails in Bhavnagar, Rajkot, Buxar, Sabarmati and many more.
