= Gujarat flood =

Gujarat flood may refer to these floods in the Indian state of Gujarat:

- 2005 Gujarat flood
- June 2015 Gujarat flood
- July 2015 Gujarat flood
- 2017 Gujarat flood
- 2024 Gujarat flood
