= 2012 Afghanistan avalanches =

Environmental disaster in Badakhshan province, Afghanistan

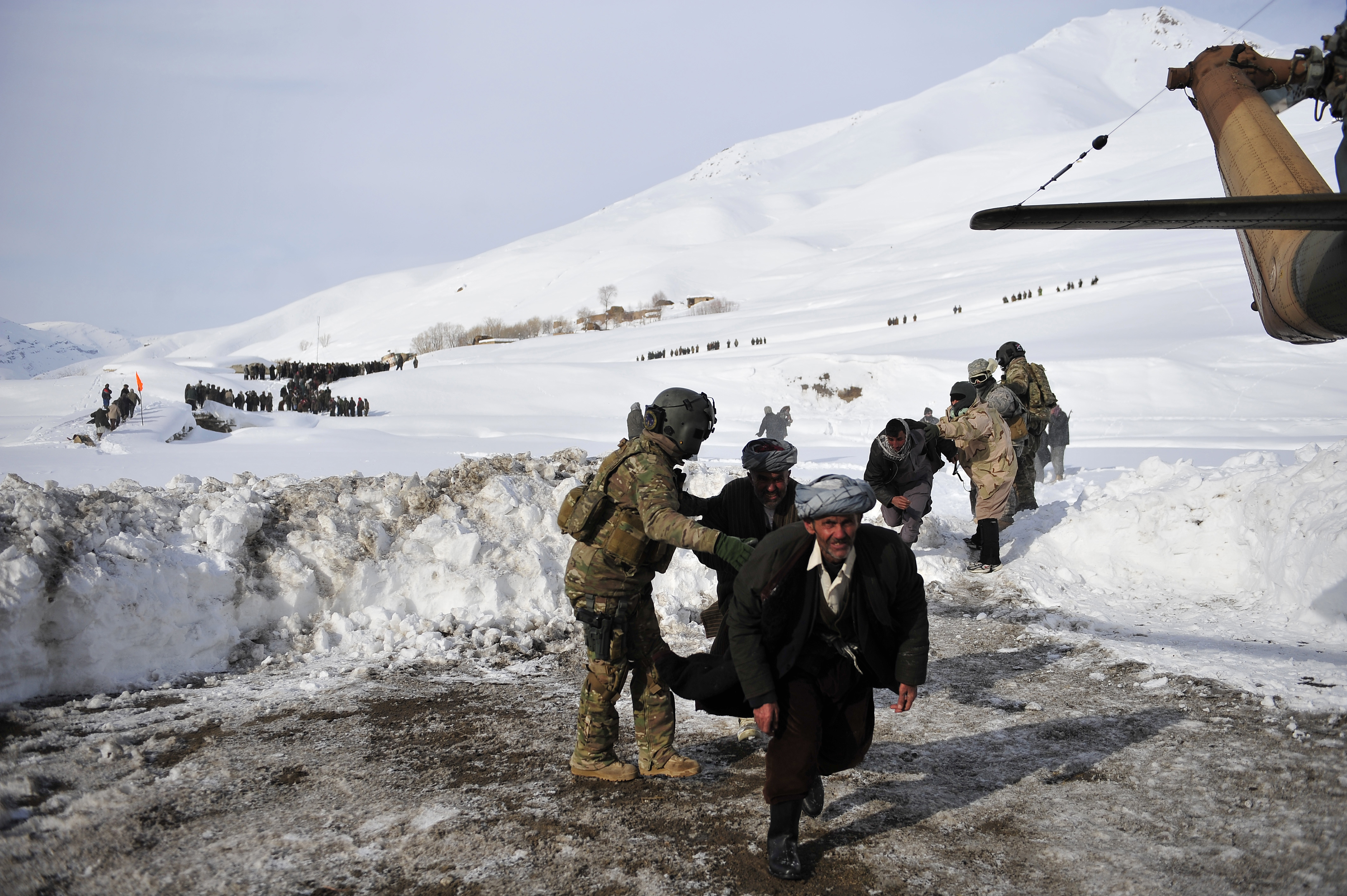

On March 4, 2012, at least three avalanches struck the Badakhshan province of northeastern Afghanistan. One of those avalanches destroyed a small village of about 200 people. The name of the village is uncertain; some sources call it Dasty and locate it in Darzab District, and others call it Sherin Nazim and locate it in Shekay District. Two other villages were affected by the avalanche. At least 50 people were killed in the disaster.

Most buildings in the village, which was home to 24 families, were completely engulfed in snow. As of March 7, 50 people had been confirmed dead, with only 7 known survivors. Of the survivors, three were away fetching water at the time of the avalanche and thus survived uninjured. Seven people were found alive in the village, but three perished due to lack of medical attention. The remaining survivors were taken to the nearest hospital, in Tajikistan, for treatment. It is believed that most or all of the town's remaining residents are dead.

The village affected by the avalanches was so remote that it took a full day for news of the disaster to reach Fayzabad, the province's capital. There are no roads in the affected area and people there generally travel on foot or horseback. Nearby villages offered what help they could, but outside rescue workers did not arrive on the scene until March 6 or 7, walking two days to get there. People from Darwaz District and twenty-five aid workers from Tajikistan were the first outside rescuers to arrive. Their progress toward the affected area was slowed by another avalanche. An aircraft carrying aid workers and journalists was unable to reach the region due to bad weather, while two Afghan Army helicopters managed to bring some aid workers into the region. Governor Shah Waliullah Adeeb tried to visit the disaster area himself, but was caught in yet another avalanche on the way and had to be rescued by helicopter.

Conditions remained extremely hazardous in the immediate aftermath of the disaster. The risk of melting snow causing widespread flooding continues to threaten a larger-scale disaster for the Northern Afghanistan. A flood could spread disease and ruin farm land.

== Cause and aftermath ==
Several days of heavy snowfall were followed by a rise in temperature, created ideal conditions for avalanches. This was part of a larger pattern of a harshest winter in 15 years. The New York Times cited the government being "woefully unprepared" to deal with natural disasters as a contributing factor. In recent years, snow has regularly cut off remote villages, making it difficult to deliver medical supplies to where they are needed. As a result, pneumonia rates have risen. More than 200 people have been killed by avalanches in Afghanistan this winter, including at least 80 in the Badakhshan province.

The United Nations had flown in tons of food and medical supplies the previous fall as part of a strategy for coping with the region's harsh winters. The aid did not appear to have helped. Three days after the disaster Fawzia Koofi, a member of parliament, remarked "so far there is no medicine, no food, no rescue yet in the area." Koofi continued by saying there should have been adequate supplies in the area and that government needed to explain how the system failed its people.

The United States Embassy in Kabul sent its condolences and arranged for supplies to be transferred to the affected region.
