= Gujarat cyclone =

Gujarat cyclone may refer to:

- 1998 Gujarat cyclone
- 2001 Gujarat cyclone
- 2015 Gujarat cyclone
