= 2017 Afghanistan avalanches =

2017 Afghanistan avalanche
- Nuristan in Afghanistan
- Date: 4 February 2017
- Location: Pakistan, Afghanistan
- Type: Snowstorm, avalanches
- Deaths: 100+
- Injuries: 60+

The 2017 Afghanistan avalanches were a series of avalanches that struck villages on the Afghanistan–Pakistan border between February 4 and 6, 2017. More than 100 people reportedly died in the disaster, including more than 50 people in Nuristan Province and at least 19 people in the neighbouring Badakhshan area of Pakistan's Chitral region. Dozens of homes and farms were destroyed, and hundreds of animals died due to the avalanches. In Pakistan, the affected areas included regions of Balochistan, Mastung, Kalat and Kharan.

Heavy snowfalls also led to blockage of roadways in the mountainous regions. On February 5, 2017, a public holiday was declared by the Afghanistan government, due to the heavy snowfall across the country. Afghanistan's president, Ashraf Ghani, expressed his condolences to the families that had lost members during the avalanches. Subsequent operations by the Afghan National Army provided emergency aid to the people of the Barg-e-Matal District in Nuristan.

== About ==
Extreme winter weather containing heavy snowfall in the region resulted in avalanches. A team of rescue operators was brought in by Afghanistan officials to help the victims. The United Nations humanitarian coordinator pledged to support the rescue operations, along with the Afghanistan government.

== Aftermath ==
A report on the Nuristan avalanche was released by the Office for the Coordination of Humanitarian Affairs (OCHA), providing details on the avalanches and the loss of life in the incident. As reported by the Red Crescent, most of the houses that collapsed were poorly constructed from clay and mud bricks. Red Crescent volunteers distributed sleeping bags, blankets, tents and tarps to help the victims of the avalanches. Reportedly, the Afghan Red Crescent Society said that around 2,617 families (15,702 individuals) had been affected by the avalanches.

== See also ==
- 2015 Afghanistan avalanches
