= 2015 Afghanistan avalanches =

2015 Afghanistan avalanche
- Location of Panjshir Province in Afghanistan
- Date: February 24, 2015-February 28, 2015
- Location: Panjshir Province, Afghanistan
- Deaths: 254
- Injuries: 72

The 2015 Afghanistan avalanches were a series of devastating snow avalanches that occurred in late February 2015 across northeastern Afghanistan, primarily affecting four provinces. The hardest hit was Panjshir Province, where entire villages were buried under the snow. The disaster claimed the lives of up to 308 people, making it one of the deadliest avalanches in Afghanistan's history. The avalanches also impacted Parwan Province, causing widespread destruction and further complicating rescue efforts in the remote, mountainous regions.

== Background ==
Afghanistan is prone to a wide range of natural disasters. The United Nations (UN) estimated that 250,000 Afghans are affected by such disasters each year. Between 1980 and 2015, Afghanistan had the second highest number of fatalities caused by natural disasters globally. During this period there were 15 major avalanches in the country.

Major avalanches occur in Afghanistan every few years and the World Bank estimated that between 2000 and 2015, over 153,000 people were affected. Additionally, over 2 million people, over 10,000 km of roads and approximately $4billion worth of assets remain exposed to them.

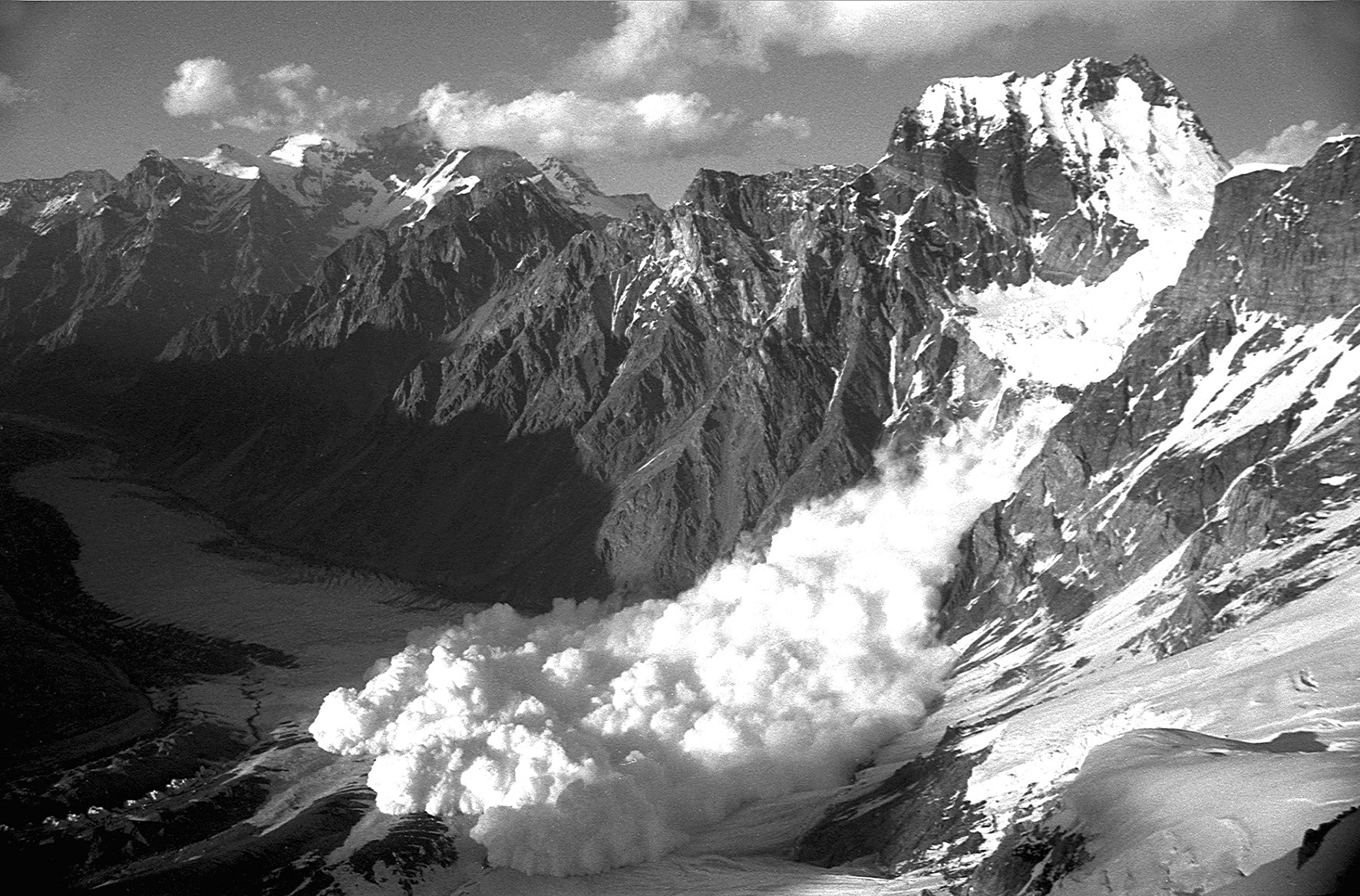
Avalanche in the Pamir Mountain Range

In 2015 alone, over 280,000 Afghans were affected by earthquakes, floods, avalanches and landslides, as well as heavy snowfall. Heavy snowfall precipitated the February 2015 avalanches. Landslides and flooding followed as the snow melted, resulting in fatalities, destruction of homes and roads, isolation of villages and increased difficulty for the government, the UN and NGOs in providing assistance to victims, especially in remote regions. The Salang Pass, an important route between the capital Kabul and provinces in the north, was blocked due to the snow.

The provinces worst affected were Laghman, Nangarhar, Panjsher, Badakhshan and Bamyan. The International Disaster Database estimated that over 33,000 people were affected, 254 people were killed, 72 injured and 6560 were left homeless.

At the end of 2014, responsibility for security was transferred from the International Security Assistance Force (ISAF), led by NATO, to the Afghan National Defence and Security Forces. The avalanches occurred shortly after this, putting an unexpected burden on the government. Despite this, the Afghan Government did not make an appeal for international help as the ongoing NATO and NGO presence meant that support was already on the ground and able to assist.

=== Geographical impact ===
Avalanches are a common hydro-meteorological hazard affecting many areas of Afghanistan. 9 of the 34 provinces are classed as high avalanche risk (including Panjshir, Badakhshan, Bamyan) and 14 as medium risk. The avalanches in February 2015 were the worst to affect Afghanistan in over 30 years. Following an unusually dry, mild winter an unprecedented amount of snow fell over 48 hours, 6 feet in places, that blocked roads connecting 20 valleys.

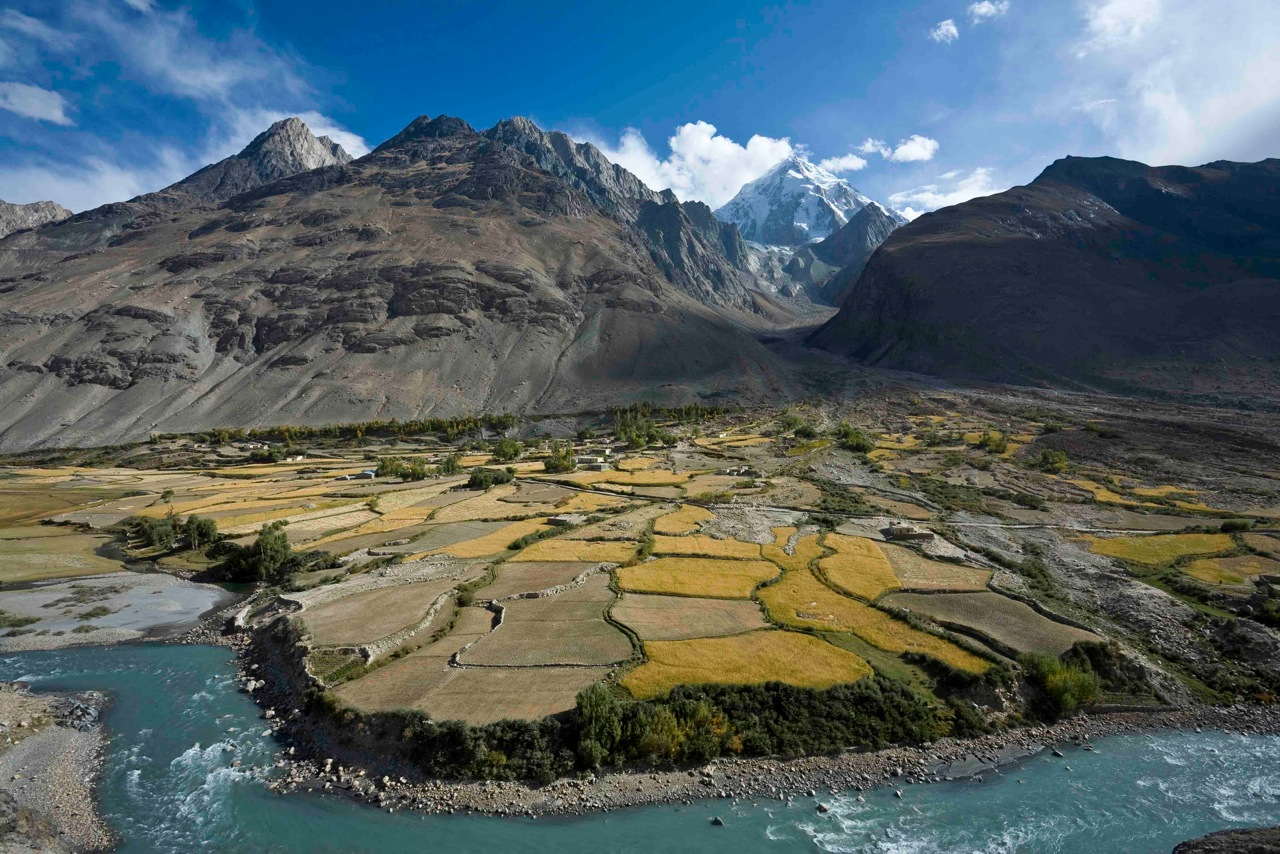
Flood plain cultivation, Wahkan Afghanistan

In Afghanistan's mountain ranges around 80% of annual precipitation falls as snow. The region affected was at the juncture between the Hindu Kush and Pamir mountains where the topography and climate undoubtedly contributed to the disaster. The region's characteristics include high-angled slopes, 7000m peaks, deep gorges, and steep sided valleys, where major snowstorms and avalanches are commonplace. The steep slopes facilitate the accumulation of snow, several active fault lines can trigger seismic activity dislodging snow slabs, and variations in temperature at the rock/ice interface cause the ice to melt improving the glide of the snow. These factors increase the probability of avalanche especially when coupled with unusually heavy snowfall.

The International Federation of Red Cross and Red Crescent Societies (IFRC) have suggested the winter season is getting longer, previously ending in January, it now extends into March. Rising temperatures due to climate change might reduce the risk of avalanche in lower regions, but higher areas are at greater risk due to increased snowfall. Snowmelt in spring and summer sustains the agriculture that Afghanistan's rural populations rely on. Traditionally valley bottoms are reserved for farming and rural communities inhabit villages on the slopes that are at risk of avalanche. Reports suggest 250,000 Afghans per year are displaced by natural disasters, but it seems communities in high-risk areas are unaware of the severity of their situation, cannot afford to move or find alternative land to settle on. This leaves many in vulnerable circumstances.

== Local and international response ==
In 2015, Afghanistan received US$424.4 million in international aid. The value supporting avalanche relief efforts specifically is unclear, however one recipient organisation, the IFRC, was involved in relief efforts through the Afghan Red Crescent Society (ARCS).

Relief efforts were also supported by philanthropic donations such as that of the Bayat Foundation, who donated US$100,000.

ARCS, through IFRC and other partners, deployed 120 volunteers providing first-aid and assistance with relief distribution. They deployed four mobile health teams (one to Panjsher) to provide medical assistance and two branch assessment teams to Panjsher for rapid assessment following clearance of blocked roads. ARCS also deployed one standby disaster response unit to Panjsher to assist if needed.

ARCS ensured daily Emergency Operations Centre meetings to assess the ongoing situation and decide on actions to be taken by the International Red Cross and Red Crescent Movement Partners.

Afghan Ministry of Defence helicopters supported relief agencies, including ARCS, delivering blankets, medicines, food, and humanitarian assistance to remote areas. Additionally, 1000 soldiers from the Kabul Corps of the Afghan army were deployed to assist rescue efforts. Emergency relief goods were also sent from neighbouring countries such as Pakistan.

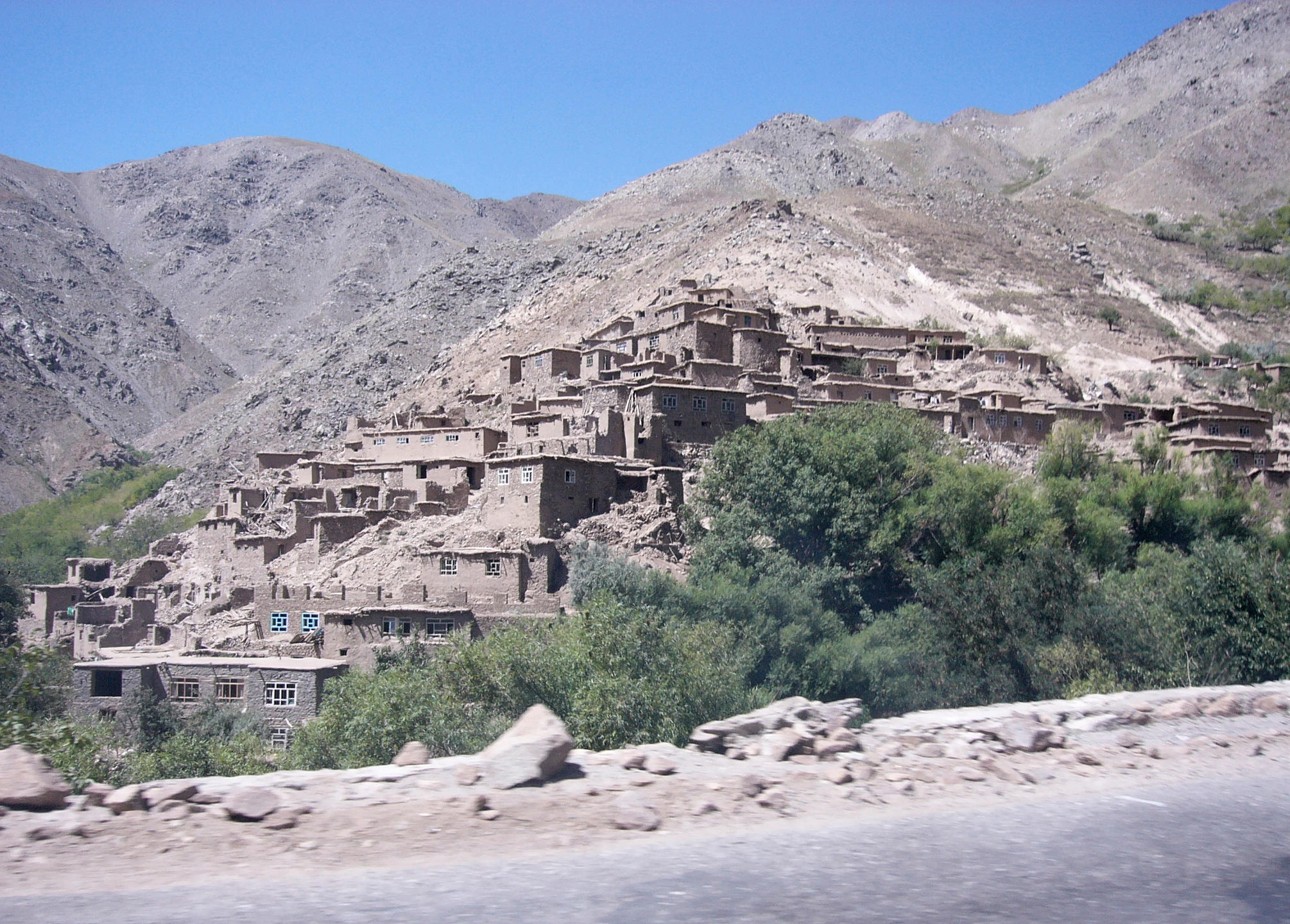
Mountain village, Salang Pass

The Afghan Wireless Communication Company deployed mobile base stations and emergency networking equipment to provide communication between villages suffering from roadblocks following the avalanches.

Ashraf Ghani, the Afghan president, allegedly pledged to establish a relief fund for those affected, however the IFRC reported that no government appeal was launched because the United Nations Office for the Coordination of Humanitarian Affairs (UNOCHA) stated that there were sufficient resources for intervention.

One reporter found locals feeling abandoned by the Government's delayed response to the disaster, with reports of wounded victims being left in their homes up to four days following the avalanches before receiving medical care.

== Immediate Aftermath ==
In comparison to 2010 and 2012, when avalanches in Afghanistan killed 172 and 201 people respectively, 2015 saw one of the worst avalanches on record in Afghanistan with 254 fatalities (although some estimates are even higher). It ranks fourth in the list of avalanche fatalities worldwide.

The areas affected had been devastated by a series of heavy snowfall over a period of two weeks from 25 February. Panjshir province was the worst affected, and fatalities here accounted for the majority of the deaths caused by the avalanches. One estimate suggested that Panjshir suffered from 198 of the total 254 deaths. The avalanches damaged 100 homes in the region.

The continued heavy snowfall resulted in snow depths of around 3 feet and many fallen trees, further blocking access to the Panjshir valley. The majority of the roads in the 20 valleys connected to the area were blocked and impassable, significantly hindering rescue operations, and further increasing the morbidity and mortality of the avalanches. Many people rescued from the avalanches suffered from hypothermia and frostbite due to their prolonged exposure to the cold temperatures, and some were affected by further medical problems secondary to this.

Other hard-hit areas were concentrated in eastern Afghanistan, with 36 deaths in Badakhshan province in the northeast, 5 in Baghlan, 5 in Parwan and 12 in Nuristan and Kunar provinces combined. By the end of March, the areas affected by heavy snow, avalanches or landslides totalled 69 districts in 17 provinces, with 2,701 houses damaged or destroyed and 2,983 families affected.

The triple disaster of heavy snowfall, avalanches and floods that followed in March led to a greater risk of subsequent waterborne diseases and an increased incidence of Typhoid fever in the Darwas-Ishkashim and Shugan regions of Badakhshan province.

== Short- and Long-Term Health Implications and Other Consequences ==
Avalanches in Afghanistan can lead to short-term and long-term effects on physical and mental health. It can indirectly affect health and well-being due to evacuation, social disruption, financial loss, lifestyle changes, damage to healthcare facilities, and changes to the wider political and socioeconomic context.

=== Short-term health implications ===
==== Physical health ====
A study of 105 avalanche victims admitted to Innsbruck University Hospital in Austria showed that of those that died, most deaths were secondary to asphyxia. Others died secondary to injuries and only 1 due to hypothermia. While there is no data on the causes of death from the avalanches in Afghanistan, it is likely that deaths due to injury and hypothermia would be higher given the fragile nature of the state and lack of resources. This would impact the time taken to reach victims by emergency services and NGOs, increasing morbidity.

=== Long-term health implications ===
==== Mental health ====
Avalanche accidents may induce post-traumatic stress disorder (PTSD), which results in some survivors experiencing significant psychological distress that affects their quality of life. The most common symptoms of PTSD are intrusive thoughts and feelings, tension, sadness, and anxiety. One study, conducted in Iceland, found that 16 years following an avalanche, 16% of survivors continued to experience avalanche-specific PTSD symptoms, illustrating its long-term implications.

=== Other consequences ===
Avalanches threaten infrastructure, such as hospitals and homes, as well as people. This can mean that rescue teams and medical assistance involved in relief efforts face physical and logistical challenges.

Avalanches also impact agricultural land, causing damage to land used for growing crops and grazing lands for animals. Evidence from earlier avalanches in these areas in 2003 demonstrated that avalanche related deposition of sediment made up almost 6% of the surface area of the valley floor. One positive of this was that farmers benefited from increased snowmelt in the spring, leading to higher-than-average crop yields.

== Lessons Learned ==
=== Disaster information gathering and risk mapping ===
The key to effective disaster risk management is understanding hazard exposure, vulnerability and accessing risk information. This is especially true in Afghanistan as it is rebuilding following natural disasters and military conflicts. To strengthen resilience, policy and investments need to incorporate information on natural hazards into their planning, design and implementation. It was suggested that a separate unit of geoscientists and land use planners be formed to update the natural hazard maps. However, in fragile states, external knowledge and support may be required. Afghanistan drew on information provided by ISAF and was supported by the World Bank to produce a risk assessment.

=== Policy ===
Afghanistan National Disaster Management Authority (ANDMA) is currently responsible for implementation and policy delivery, however, their provincial branches are severely under-resourced and do not have the necessary skills to save a lot of people during times of crisis. While there have been a series of National Disaster Management Plans published, there is a need to revisit these plans to ensure that its contents are implemented and address issues where the disasters are focused on a particular community or province.

Afghanistan needs simple, sustainable and inexpensive avalanche solutions because of the technology, terrain and financial situation. Focus Humanitarian Assistance (FOCUS) works on a community basis to reduce avalanche mortality in vulnerable villages through simple, low-cost programmes such as manual weather stations, education and basic avalanche awareness training at local level.

=== Infrastructure ===
Avalanche mitigation measures to protect infrastructure and settlements are often missing, while other avalanche warning systems were built privately at a cost of US$2.5 billion. Restorative short-term activities, including the construction of mitigation structures, protection of national roads and the establishment of weather stations to assess changing weather patterns in a timely manner are required in affected communities. Avalanche risk can be reduced by retention structures such as concrete galleries over highways and early warning systems.

== See also ==
- 2010 Salang avalanches
- 2012 Afghanistan avalanches
- 2015 Badakhshan landslides
- 2017 Afghanistan avalanches
