= Gujarat University of Transplantation Sciences =

Medical State University

- Type: Public
- Established: 2015; 11 years ago
- Affiliations: UGC
- Chancellor: Governor of Gujarat
- Vice-Chancellor: Pranjal Modi
- Location: Ahmedabad, Gujarat, India; 23.050156°N 72.601786°E
- Campus: Urban
- Website: www.guts.ac.in

Gujarat University of Transplantation Sciences (GUTS) is a state university located at Ahmedabad, Gujarat, India. It was established in 2015 by the Government of Gujarat and focuses on transplantation sciences.

== History ==
The Gujarat University of Transplantation Sciences marks its beginning with the establishment of the Smt. G.R. Doshi and Smt. K.M.Mehta Institute of Kidney Diseases and Research Centre (IKDRC) in 1981. A sister institute to be established was the Institute of Transplantation Sciences (ITS) established in 1997, and renamed as Dr. H.L. Trivedi Institute of Transplantation Sciences in 2006, after H. L. Trivedi. IKDRC-ITS was the first constituent institute of the university, when it was established by the Government of Gujarat in 2015.
