= Dasty =

- Village
- Country: Afghanistan
- Province: Badakhshan
- District: Shekay

Dasty or Dispy was a village in Badakhshan Province, Afghanistan. It was destroyed by an avalanche on March 3, 2012.
