= Hargovind Laxmishanker Trivedi =

Indian nephrologist (1932–2019)

Dr Hargovind Laxmishanker Trivedi
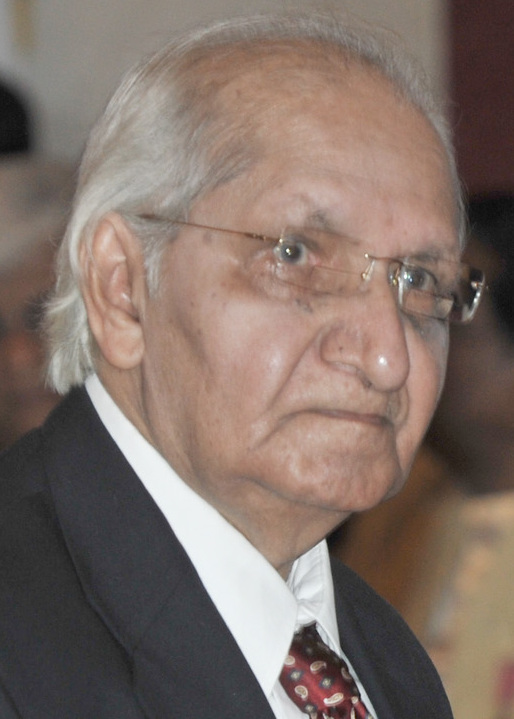
- Trivedi in 2015
- Born: 31 August 1932; Charadva, Halvad, Gujarat, British India
- Died: 2 October 2019 (aged 87); Ahmedabad, Gujarat, India
- Occupation(s): Nephrologist, immunologist, transplant surgeon, stem cell researcher
- Spouse: Sunita Trivedi
- Parent: Laxmishanker Trivedi
- Awards: Padma Shri (2015)

Dr Hargovind Laxmishanker "H. L." Trivedi (31 August 1932 – 2 October 2019) was an Indian nephrologist, immunologist, transplant surgeon and stem cell researcher.

He was a pioneer of transplantation medicine in India and a founding director of the Kidney Hospital in Ahmedabad. He and his team performed more than 5200 kidney transplantations. He was awarded the Padma Shri in 2015.

== Early life ==
Trivedi was born on 31 August 1932 in the village of Charadva near Halvad (now in Morbi district, Gujarat). His father Laxmishankar Trivedi was a teacher. He completed his primary education from Lunsar village near Wankaner. He studied pre-medical at the Faculty of Science, Dharamendrasinhji College, Rajkot from 1951 to 1953 and then an MBBS degree at the B. J. Medical College, Ahmedabad from 1953 to 1963.

== Career ==
He had higher training for two years in the Cleveland Clinic in the US, and practiced for eight years in Hamilton, Ontario, Canada. A visit to his native land changed his mind and he returned to Ahmedabad in 1977 to continue his practice in India. He joined B. J. Medical College as a professor of nephrology.

He founded the Institute of Kidney Diseases and Research Centre (IKDRC, also known as Kidney Hospital) located in the Ahmedabad Civil Hospital campus on 7 October 1981. His friends and industrialists Rasiklal Doshi and Mafatlal Mehta helped with donation of ₹1 crore (equivalent to ₹20 crore or US$2.3 million in 2023). The institute was moved to the new building in 1992. The Institute of Transplantation Sciences (ITS) was established in 1997 in the same campus. It is the largest kidney hospital in the world with 438 beds. He and his team completed more than 5200 kidney transplantations in the institute. It is also the only public-sector liver transplantation institute in India. IKDRC-ITS was upgraded into the Gujarat University of Transplantation Sciences in 2015 and Trivedi was appointed its Pro-Chancellor.

He founded the Indian Society of Organ Transplantation. He was also the founding chief editor of the Indian Journal of Transplantation and Indian Journal of Nephrology. He held several patents on stem-cell therapy for transplantation tolerance and insulin producing stem cells. His autobiography Tryst with Destiny (1996) is translated in Gujarati as Purusharth Potano: Prasad Prabhuno (2016) by Aruna Vanikar.

He died on 2 October 2019 in Ahmedabad after prolonged illness. He suffered from neurological and liver ailments, as well as Parkinson's disease.

== Recognition ==
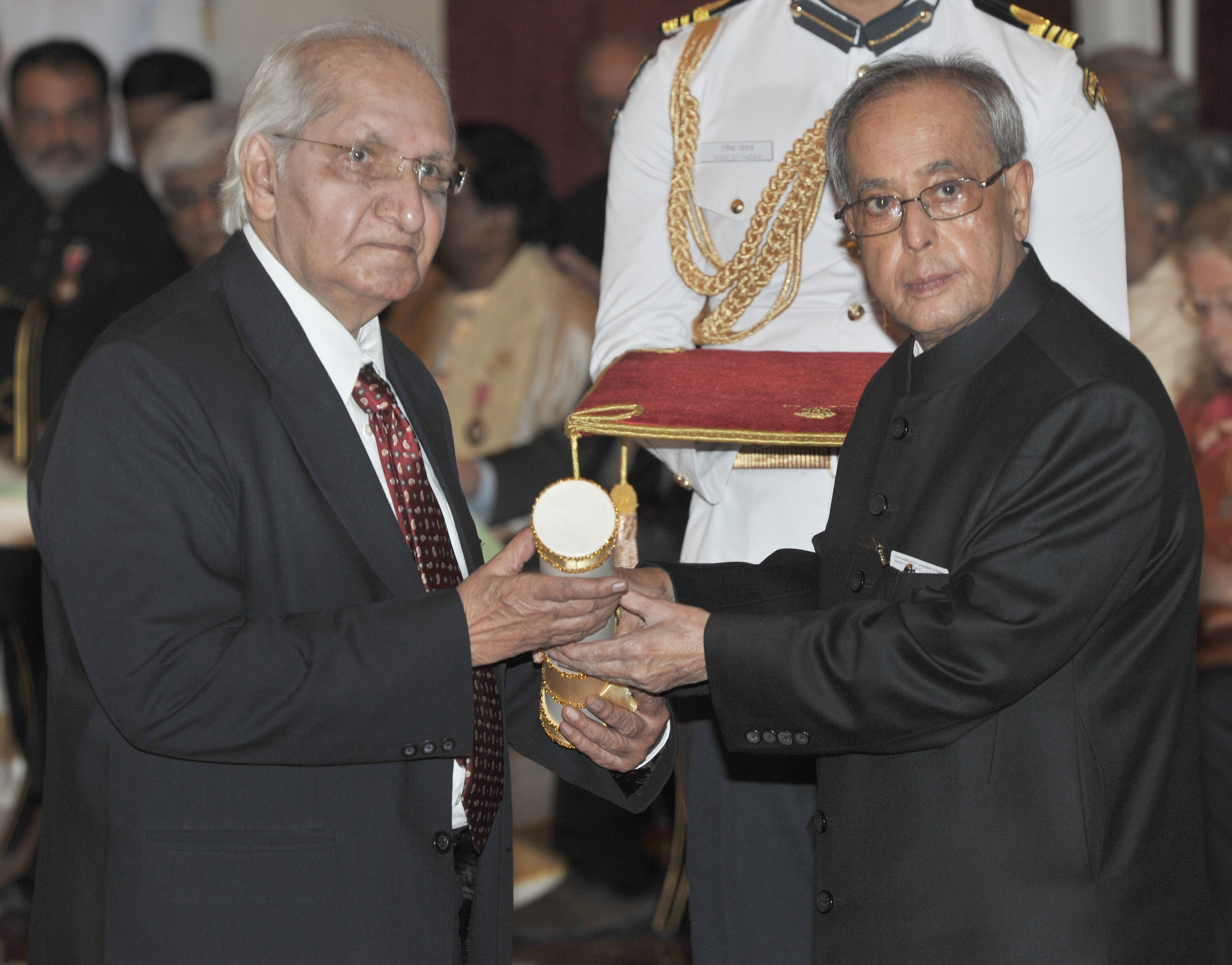
Trivedi (left) being presented Padma Shri by the President of India, Pranab Mukherjee, at a Civil Investiture Ceremony, at Rashtrapati Bhavan, in New Delhi on 8 April 2015

Trivedi was a Fellow of the Royal College of Physicians of Canada (FRCP(C)). In 2006, the Institute of Transplantation Sciences was renamed Dr. H. L. Trivedi Institute of Transplantation Sciences in his honour. He was awarded an honorary Doctor of Science (D.Sc.) degree by King George's Medical University in 2009. He was felicitated as a Nagar Ratna by Ahmedabad Municipal Corporation in 2014.

He was honoured by the Government of India in 2015 with the Padma Shri, the fourth highest Indian civilian award. He was also awarded by The Transplantation Society in 2018.

== Selected papers ==
- D. Saboo; P.R. Shah; K.R. Goplani; A. Feroz; M. Gumber; A.V. Vanikar; H.L. Trivedi (May 2008). "Posttransplant Diabetes Mellitus: A Single-Center Study". Transplantation Proceedings. 40 (4): 1111–1113. doi:10.1016/j.transproceed.2008.04.002. PMID 18555126.
- U G Thakkar; V V Mishra; AV Vanikar; H V Patel; R S Agrawal; VR Shah (2014). "Assessment of children born to mothers who are renal allograft recipients". Sri Lanka Journal of Child Health. 43 (1): 27–32. doi:10.4038/sljch.v43i1.6658.
