= 2015 Badakhshan landslides =

Landslides in Afghanistan

- Location of Badakhshan Province in Afghanistan
- Date: 23–26 April 2015
- Time: 12:30 a.m.
- Location: Badakhshan Province, Afghanistan
- Cause: Heavy snowfall
- Deaths: 52
- Property damage: 100 houses

On 23 April 2015, a landslide occurred in the Khawahan district of Badakhshan Province in Afghanistan. Around 100 houses were destroyed and 52 people were killed by the landslide. A second landslide occurred on 26 April, displacing 120 families.

== Background ==
Landslides are common in eastern Afghanistan as snow begins to melt during the spring months. Deforestation has led to an increase in the number of landslides annually. Badakhshan Province is among the poorest and least-developed areas of Afghanistan. A pair of mudslides in May 2014 killed several hundred people in Badakhshan.

== Landslides ==
At roughly 12:30 a.m. local time on 23 April 2015, a landslide occurred in the Khawahan district of Badakhshan Province in north-eastern Afghanistan. Due to the remote nature of the affected area, reports of the incident did not surface until 28 April. Initial reports indicated that only one village, Jero Bala, was hit by the landslide, but that that village was "completely wiped out". A second landslide occurred in Badakhshan on 26 April.

At least 52 people – 25 women, 22 children, and 5 men – were killed by the 23 April landslide. Ninety-five homes were destroyed. An unknown number of additional people are missing and feared buried under the landslide. Noticing cracks forming in the snow in the mountains near their village, several families had left Jero Bala prior to the landslide. The 26 April landslide displaced 120 families, but no deaths were reported.

Around 25 inches (0.64 m) of rain fell in the days leading up to the landslide, adding to 3 feet (0.91 m) of snow already on the ground. The Afghanistan government sent helicopters to the region to transport aid workers and police to Jero Bala. However, District Governor Ghufran Zaki remarked "We do not have any equipment to rescue any possible survivors buried under a huge mountain of mud." The village was inaccessible via roads due to heavy snow in the region, and telecommunications were inoperable. Afghan president Ashraf Ghani said he was "deeply saddened" by news of the disaster.

== See also ==
- 2015 Afghanistan avalanches
