= Shirin Nazem =

- Village
- Country: Afghanistan
- Province: Badakhshan
- District: Shekay

Population (2012)
  - Total: 200

Shirin Nazem or Sherin Nazim is a village is Badakhshan Province, Afghanistan. It was hit by an avalanche in 2012 that killed 37 people.

== See also ==
- Badakhshan Province
