= July 2015 Gujarat flood =

Flood in Gujarat, India

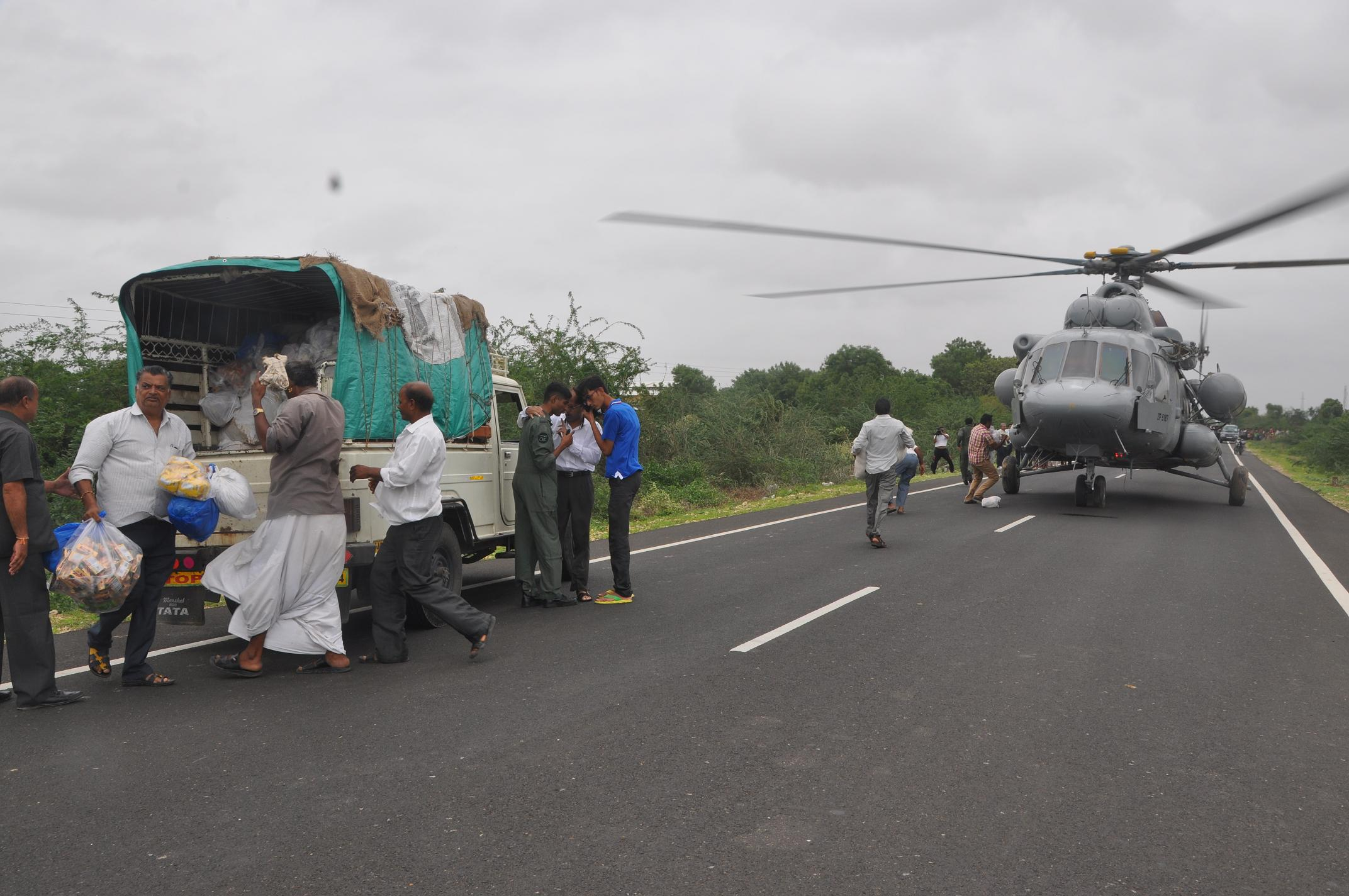
- Helicopter deployed by Indian Air Force for rescue
- Date: 27–30 July 2015
- Location: Gujarat, India
- Deaths: At least 72
- Property damage: ₹20 billion government estimate

Following heavy rain, Gujarat state of India was affected by the flood in July 2015. The flood resulted in at least 72 deaths.

== Background ==
The monsoon in Gujarat typically start in mid-June every year. Following deep depression in Arabian Sea, there was heavy rain in the June 2015 which resulted in flood in the state.

The deep depression over south-west Rajasthan and adjoining Gujarat resulted in heavy rain across north Gujarat and southern parts of Rajasthan.

== Flood ==
At least 72 people died in the flood; 40 in Banaskantha district, 6 in Patan district, 4 in Kutch district and others in other parts of the state.[1]

Over 81,609 cattle died in three districts; Banaskantha, Patan and Kutch. It included 42,609 were large cattle like cows and buffaloes, while 38,871 were small cattle, such as goats and sheep. The property worth ₹2000 crore was completely damaged or washed away as per government estimate. The crops in about 2 lakh hectares failed.[1]

In three days, all talukas of Kutch and Banaskantha district recorded over 100 per cent of annual average rainfall. Some areas, like Suigam, recorded 510 per cent of the total annual average rainfall. In Mehsana district, as many as 585 villages lost the electricity supply. Several dams across Gujarat were flooded.[3]

== Relief and rescue ==
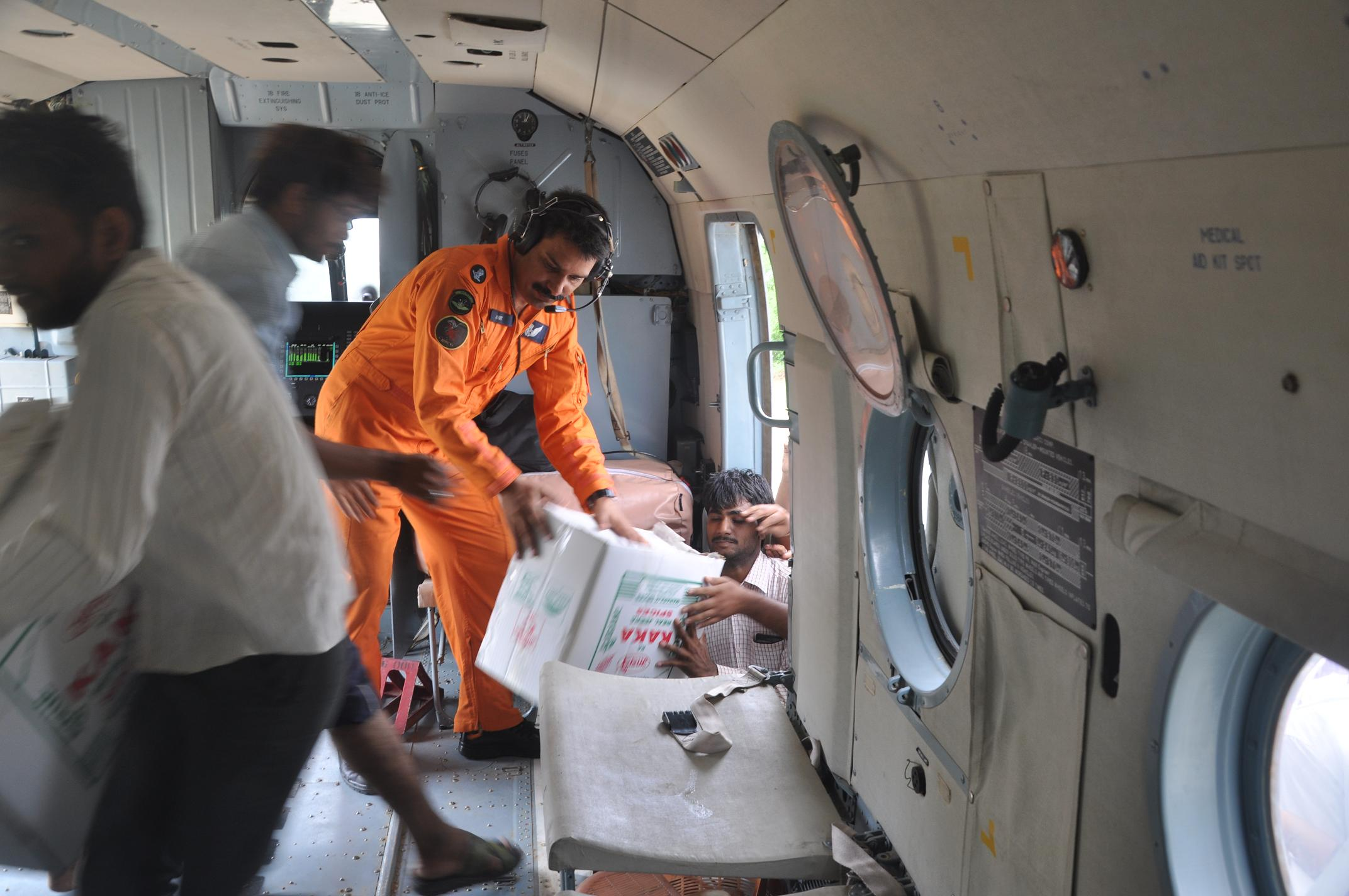
Indian Air Force personnel distributing relief material

Total 14 districts of the state and a population of about 4 million were affected. The electricity supply was restored to more than 700 villages in four days.

Three helicopter from Indian Air Force (IAF) and Border Security Force (BSF) were deployed for relief and rescue. A total of 28 relief teams, seven medical teams and seven Engineer Task Forces of the army was deployed. The 17 teams comprising 510 National Disaster Response Force and 180 BSF personnel were engaged in the relief and rescue. The seven columns of indian Army and 5 companies of State Reserve Police Force was deployed in affected areas. The army rescued more than 1,000 people. The army engineer task forces restored railway line connecting Jodhpur and Bhuj which had a daily traffic of 12 passenger and 45 goods trains. The line was damaged between Dhanera and Ramsan due to soil erosion.

A total of 2.5 lakh cusecs of water was released into the Sabarmati River from the Dharoi dam due to an incoming large amount of water. More than 1500 people were evacuated living near Sabarmati river in Ahmedabad and adjoining districts.

The Government of Gujarat announced the relief package. The compensation for soil erosion was declared ₹ 25,000 per hectare for small farmers while ₹ 50,000 for farmers having land more than two hectares. The maximal assistance was set at ₹ 60,000. For soil restoration, the government provided 5% interest subsidy for ₹ 1 lakh for small farmers and ₹ 2 lakh for big farmers. For crop damage, the assistance of ₹ 13,600 for minor crop and ₹ 18,000 for major crop up to one hectare land while for horticulture and banana, the assistance of ₹ 18,000 up to one hectare land was announced. For cattle deaths, the assistance of ₹ 180,000 for death of five cows or buffalo was announced. The small traders were assisted with ₹ 10,000 and shopowners with ₹ 35,000. For household damage, ₹ 7,000 were given as an assistance.
