= Deep Depression ARB 02 (2015) =

North Indian cyclone in 2015

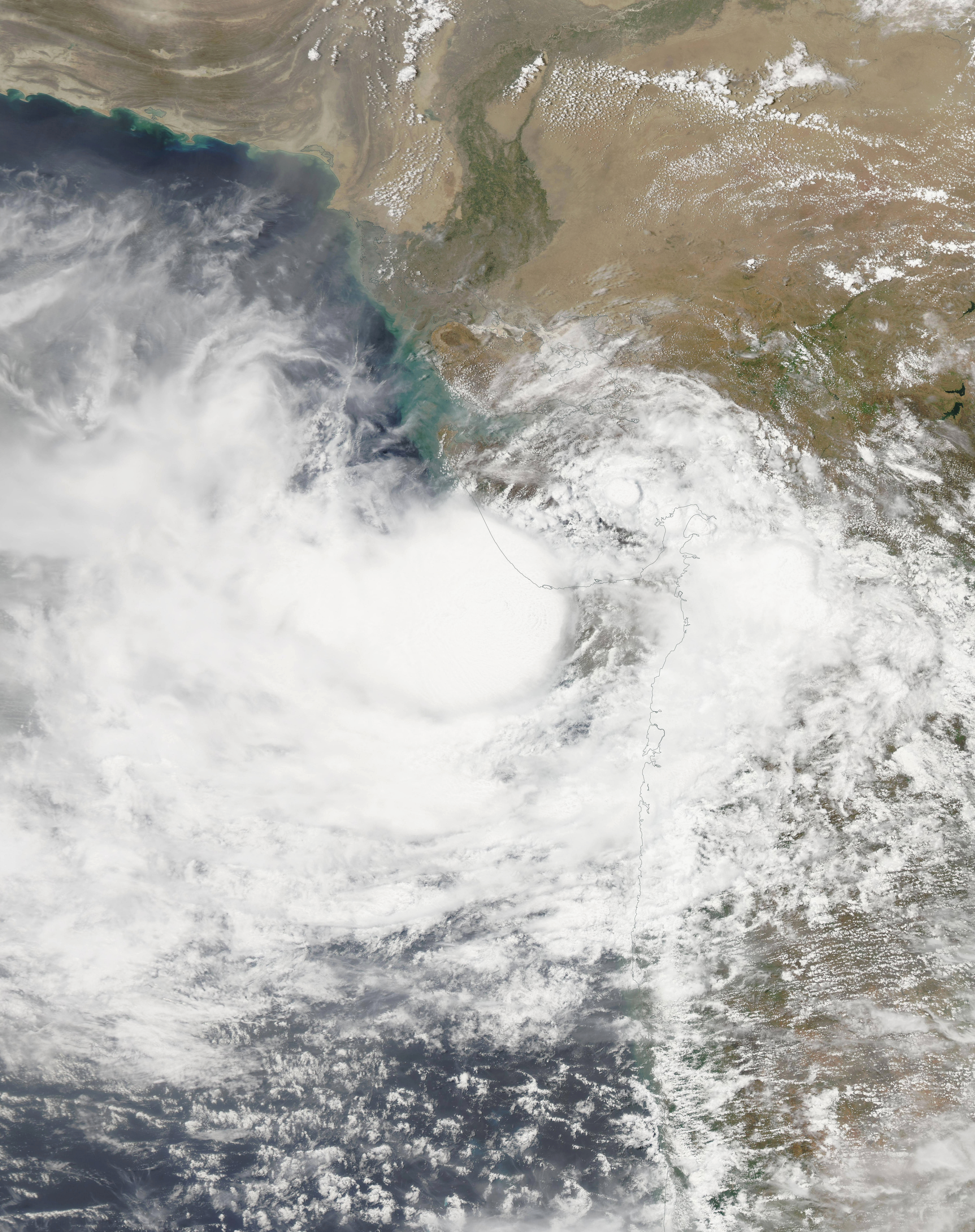
- ARB 02 approaching the Gujarati coast on 23 June

Meteorological history
- Formed: 22 June 2015
- Dissipated: 24 June 2015

Deep depression
- 3-minute sustained (IMD)
- Highest winds: 55 km/h (35 mph)
- Lowest pressure: 988 hPa (mbar); 29.18 inHg

Overall effects
- Fatalities: 81
- Damage: $260 million (2015 USD) (Government estimate)
- Areas affected: West India (particularly Gujarat)
- IBTrACS
- Part of the 2015 North Indian Ocean cyclone season

Deep Depression ARB 02 was a weak tropical cyclone which brought heavy rains and flooding to the Indian state of Gujarat in June 2015. It was the third tropical cyclone and second deep depression of the 2015 North Indian Ocean cyclone season.

Flooding in the Amreli district was reported to be the worst in 90 years; 600 of the district's 838 villages were affected, 400 of which were rendered inaccessible by land. At least 80 people died in the region, with Saurashtra suffering the greatest losses. The wild life of Gir Forest National Park and the adjoining area was also affected. Ten Asiatic lions, an endangered species with only 523 living individuals documented in May 2015, died during the floods while more than a dozen remain missing. The Gujarat government estimated damage at ₹16.5 billion (US$258 million); however, Congress MLA Paresh Dhanani claimed damage to be as high as ₹70 billion (US$1.09 billion).

== Meteorological history ==
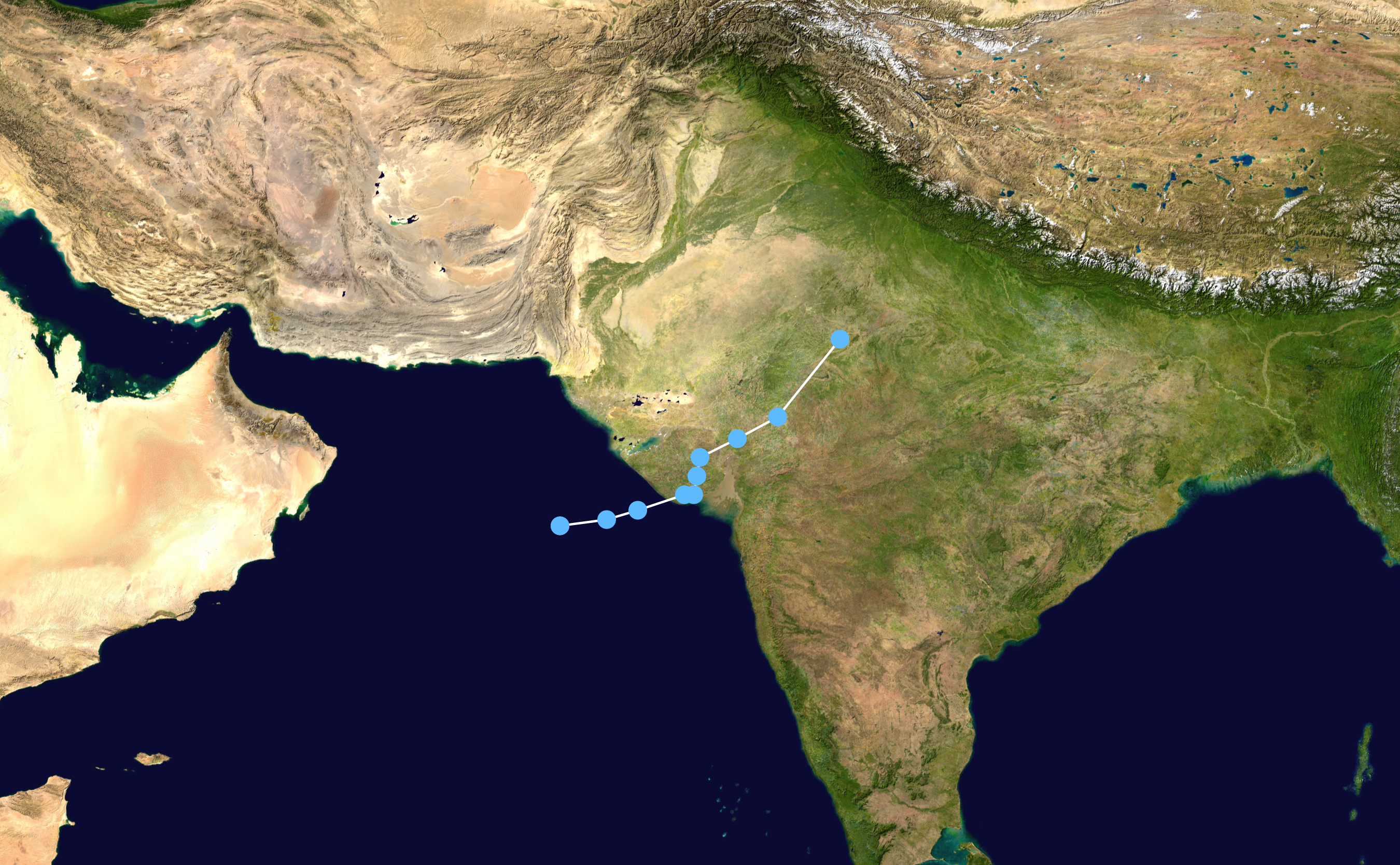
Map plotting the storm's track and intensity, according to the Saffir–Simpson scale Map key Saffir–Simpson scale Tropical depression (≤38 mph, ≤62 km/h) Tropical storm (39–73 mph, 63–118 km/h) Category 1 (74–95 mph, 119–153 km/h) Category 2 (96–110 mph, 154–177 km/h) Category 3 (111–129 mph, 178–208 km/h) Category 4 (130–156 mph, 209–251 km/h) Category 5 (≥157 mph, ≥252 km/h) Unknown Storm type Tropical cyclone Subtropical cyclone Extratropical cyclone, remnant low, tropical disturbance, or monsoon depression

The monsoon in Gujarat typically starts in mid-June every year. Following a series of monsoonal disturbances, a fresh wave of thunderstorms organized into an area of low pressure on 21 June in the Arabian Sea, off the coast of Gujarat. Deep convection persisted to the west of the system while the circulation continued to develop over the next 24 hours, and the IMD started tracking it as a depression, with the identifier ARB 02. ARB 02 continued to develop and by the night of 22 June, the JTWC issued a TCFA on the system, while it was 285 nmi (528 km; 328 mi) west-northwest of Mumbai.

== Impact ==
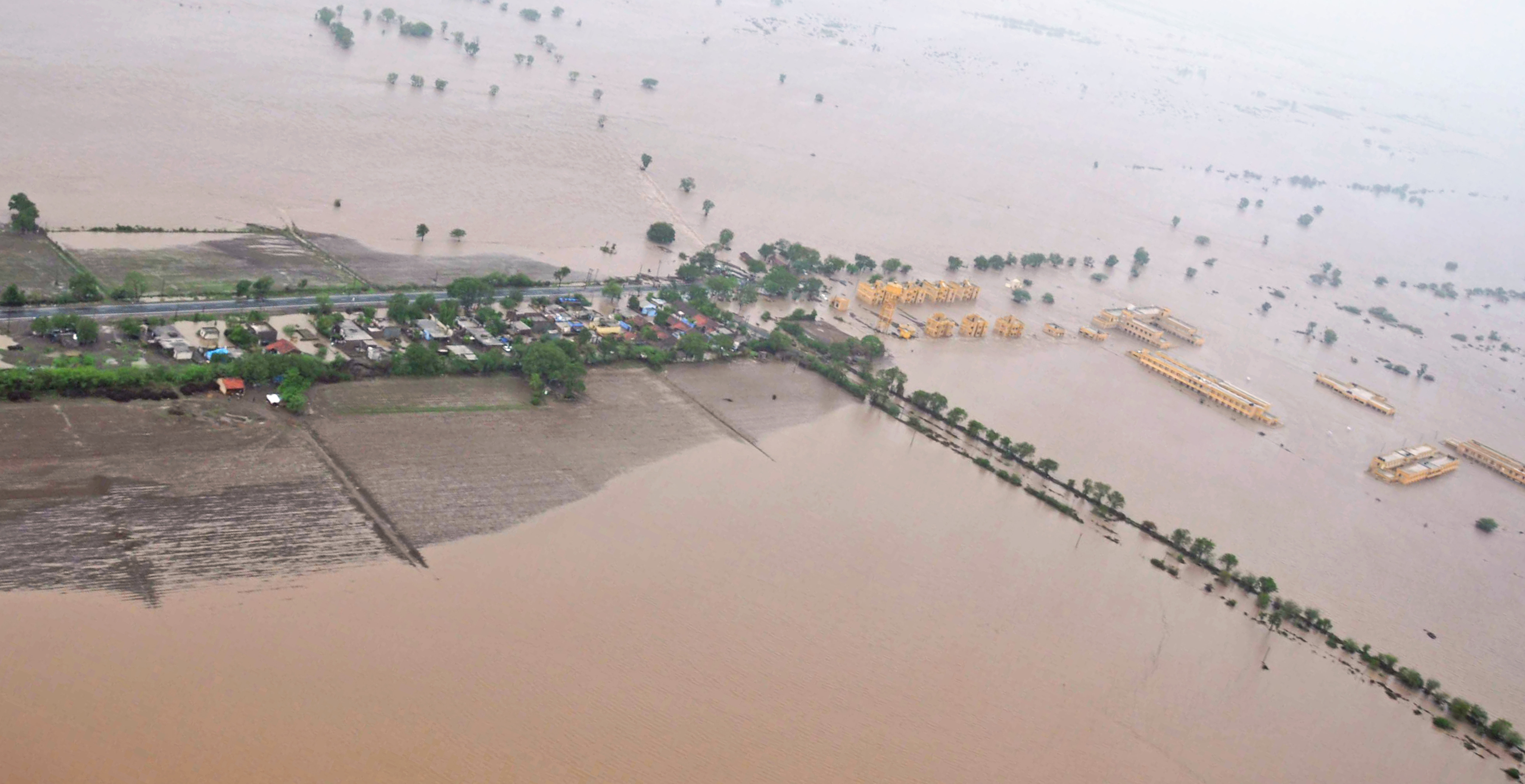
Flood affected areas of Amreli district on 24 June 2015

There were heavy rains on 23 and 24 June 2015 across Gujarat.Saurashtra and south Gujarat received 65.99% and 37.82% respectively of their average monsoon season rainfall in June. Central-East Gujarat received 19.92%, north Gujarat 7.45% and Kutch 7.30% of their average monsoon season rainfall. Overall Gujarat received 33.95% of its average monsoon season rainfall. These large amounts of rain falling in a short period of time resulted in flooding in Saurashtra region.

Torrential rains battered Gujarat, with peak accumulations of 636 mm (25.0 in) in Bagasara, 511 mm (20.1 in) in Dhari, and 400 mm (16 in) in Variyav. Severe flooding ensued across the region, isolating many villages in the Saurashtra region.

In Saurashtra, Amreli district was badly affected, facing its worst flood in ninety years. Nearly 600 of the 838 villages in the district were flooded. More than 400 villages were inaccessible as road and rail connections were washed away due to flash floods and they had no electricity. Shetrunji river and its tributaries were flooded. A railway bridge near Gavadka collapsed and a railway line was washed away near Borala village near Savarkundla. Paschim Gujarat Vij Company Ltd (PGVCL) declared 705 electricity poles damaged. In Rajkot district, more than 1700 houses sustained damage. Jetpur town was flooded as the floodgates of Bhadar dam were opened.

There was severe damage to crops and a large number of cattle died. The flood and heavy rain resulted in 81 deaths across Gujarat. The preliminary damage estimated by the government were at ₹1650 crore (US$260 million), but The Indian Express estimated the damage at ₹7000 crore (US$1.1 billion), much higher than the government's estimation. However, Congress MLA Paresh Dhanani claimed damage to be as high as ₹70 billion (US$1.09 billion).

The Gir Forest National Park and adjoining area housing Asiatic lions, an endangered species with only 523 living individuals documented in May 2015, was severely affected. The carcasses of 10 lions, 1670 Nilgai, 87 spotted deer, nine black bucks, six wild boars and some porcupines were also recovered.

A total of 1,12,217 farmers suffered major or minor damages, while 1,34,007 hectares of land were eroded.

== Aftermath ==
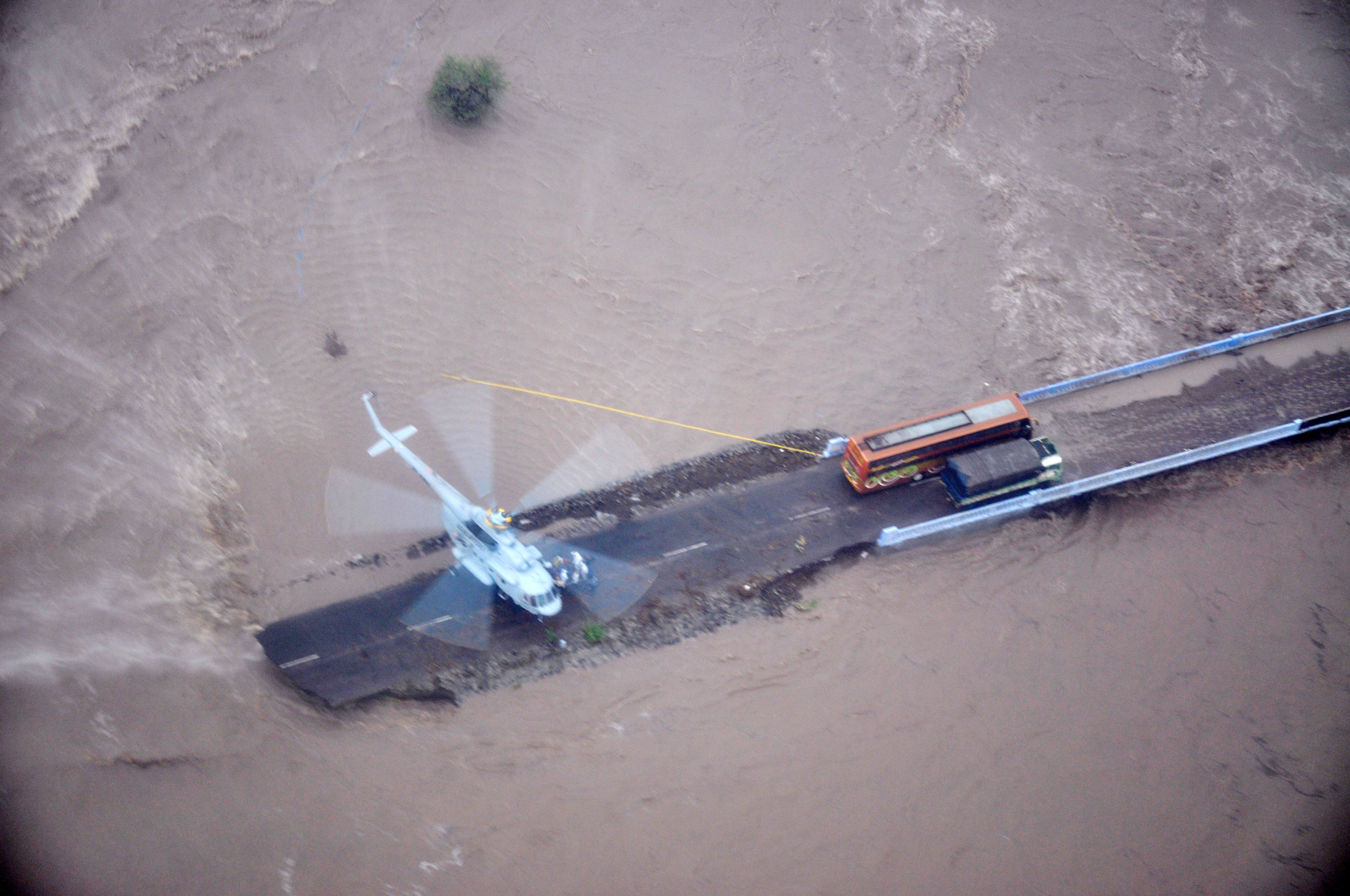
People being rescued by Indian Air Force helicopter

The state government deployed the Indian Air Force (IAF) and National Disaster Response Force (NDRF) for rescue and relief operation. On 25 June 2015, IAF helicopters delivered more than 200,000 food packets to villages affected by the flood. Around 4,000 people were evacuated from seventeen villages downstream of Bhadar dam. More than 200 people were rescued from various places affected by the floods. The Chief Minister of Gujarat, Anandiben Patel declared Rs 400,000 as compensation to the kin of each of the deceased.

The Government of Gujarat announced a ₹300 crore relief package which included ₹150 crore from the National Calamity Relief Fund.

Another flood affected Gujarat a month after this storm.

== See also ==
- July 2015 Gujarat flood
- Cyclone Phyan
- Cyclone Ockhi
