= 2004 Myanmar cyclone =

North Indian tropical cyclone in 2004

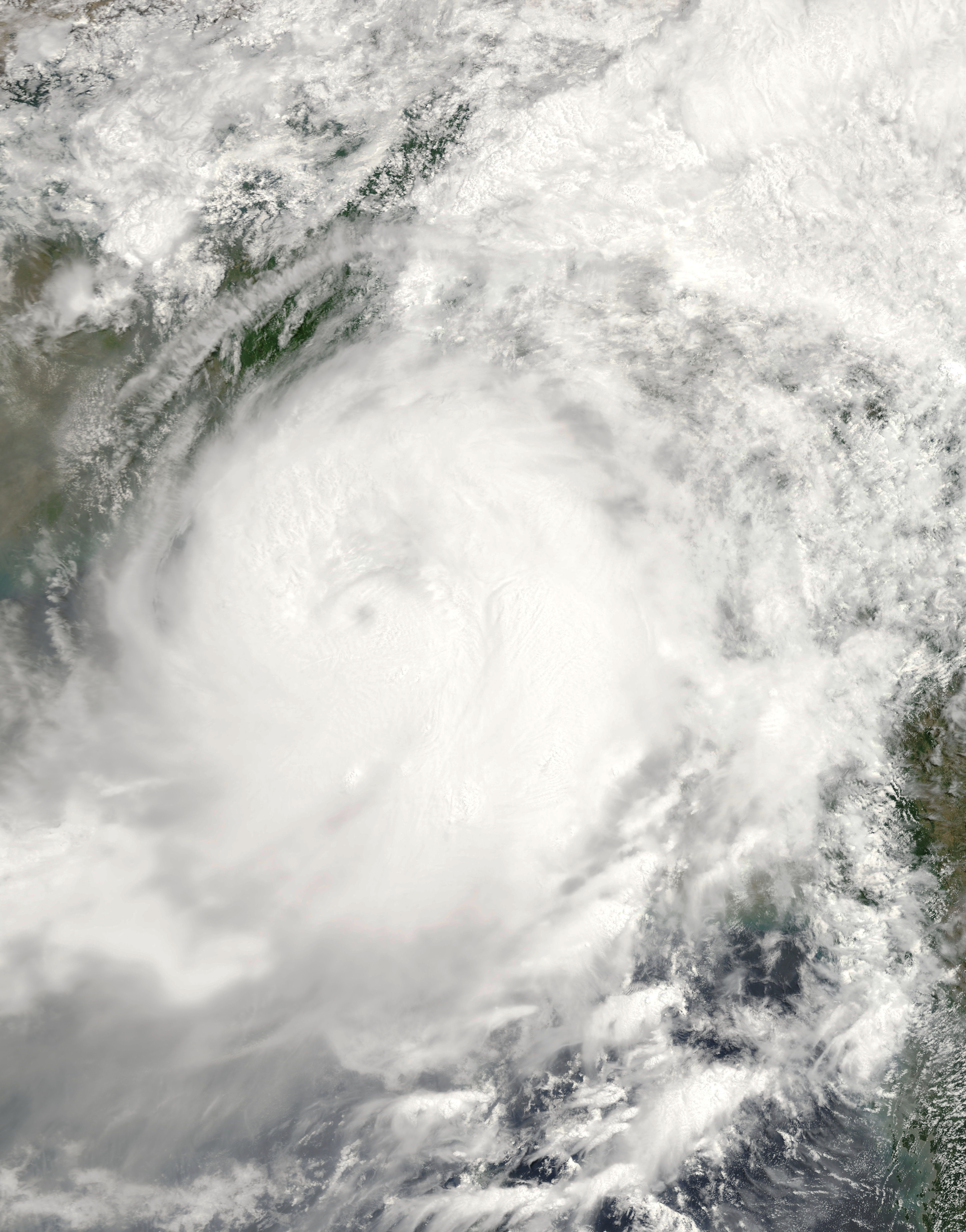
- Satellite image of the cyclone offshore Myanmar

Meteorological history
- Formed: May 16, 2004
- Dissipated: May 19, 2004

Extremely severe cyclonic storm
- 3-minute sustained (IMD)
- Highest winds: 165 km/h (105 mph)
- Lowest pressure: 952 hPa (mbar); 28.11 inHg

Category 1-equivalent tropical cyclone
- 1-minute sustained (SSHWS/JTWC)
- Highest winds: 120 km/h (75 mph)
- Lowest pressure: 976 hPa (mbar); 28.82 inHg

Overall effects
- Fatalities: 236 total
- Damage: $99.2 million (2004 USD)
- Areas affected: Odisha, Bangladesh, Myanmar, Thailand, Yunnan
- IBTrACS
- Part of the 2004 North Indian Ocean cyclone season

The 2004 Myanmar cyclone was considered the worst to strike the country since 1968. The second tropical cyclone of the 2004 North Indian Ocean cyclone season, it formed as a depression on May 16 in the central Bay of Bengal. With low wind shear and a surge in the monsoon trough, the storm intensified while meandering over open waters. The storm eventually began a steady northeastward motion due to a ridge to the north over India. While approaching land, an eye developed in the center of the storm, indicative of a strong cyclone. On May 19, the cyclone made landfall along northwestern Myanmar near Sittwe, with maximum sustained winds estimated at 165 km/h (105 mph) by the India Meteorological Department. The storm rapidly weakened over land, although its remnants spread rainfall into northern Thailand and Yunnan province in China.

Winds from the cyclone reached 157 km/h (98 mph) in Myanmar, occurring in conjunction with heavy rainfall and a high storm surge. Despite the storm's ferocity, the government did not report about the cyclone for ten days, as they usually under-report on landfalling storms. The cyclone caused heavy damage throughout Rakhine State, destroying or heavily damaging 4,035 homes and leaving 25,000 people homeless. There was widespread crop damage, resulting in food shortages, and damaged roads disrupted subsequent relief efforts. Damage in Myanmar totaled over K621 million kyat ($99.2 million USD), making it the worst storm in the country since 1968, and there were 236 deaths, with an unofficial death toll as high as 1,000. Although damage was heaviest in Myanmar, the cyclone's effects also spread into neighboring Bangladesh, where strong winds knocked over trees and capsized two ships.

== Meteorological history ==
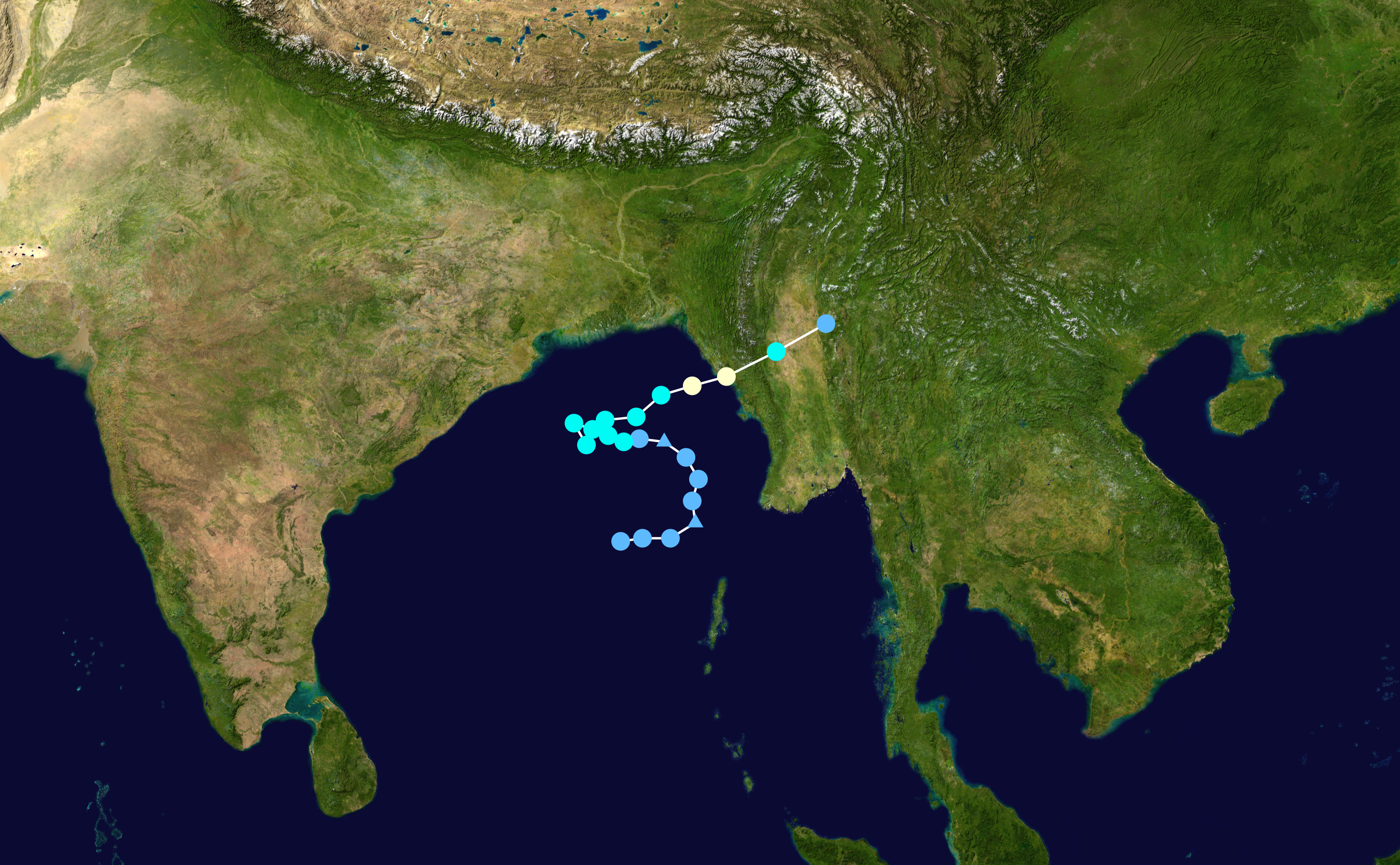
Map plotting the storm's track and intensity, according to the Saffir–Simpson scale Map key Saffir–Simpson scale Tropical depression (≤38 mph, ≤62 km/h) Tropical storm (39–73 mph, 63–118 km/h) Category 1 (74–95 mph, 119–153 km/h) Category 2 (96–110 mph, 154–177 km/h) Category 3 (111–129 mph, 178–208 km/h) Category 4 (130–156 mph, 209–251 km/h) Category 5 (≥157 mph, ≥252 km/h) Unknown Storm type Tropical cyclone Subtropical cyclone Extratropical cyclone, remnant low, tropical disturbance, or monsoon depression

Late on May 14, an area of convection, or thunderstorms, developed in the central Bay of Bengal about 880 kilometres (550 miles) south-southeast of Kolkata, India, associated with the monsoon trough. On May 15, the system developed into a low-pressure area off the west coast of Myanmar (Burma). Initially, the convection was associated with a low-level circulation center, developing good outflow despite the presence of wind shear. As the shear decreased, the thunderstorms increased and organized, with the eastward-moving circulation partially exposed. At 09:00 UTC on May 16, the India Meteorological Department (Note: The India Meteorological Department is the official Regional Specialized Meteorological Center for the northern Indian Ocean.) classified the system as a depression, and nine hours later the agency upgraded it to a deep depression as the system turned northwestward.

The nascent system quickly organized, aided by the decreasing wind shear, as well as a surge in the monsoon. The IMD upgraded the depression to a cyclonic storm at 03:00 UTC on May 17. At 12:00 UTC that day, the Joint Typhoon Warning Center (JTWC) (Note: The Joint Typhoon Warning Center is a joint United States Navy – United States Air Force task force that issues tropical cyclone warnings for the northern Indian Ocean and other regions.) began issuing warnings on the system with its own designation Tropical Cyclone 02B. With weak steering currents, the storm meandered over the central Bay of Bengal, executing a small cyclonic loop over 30 hours. The cloud pattern organized into a central dense overcast that was initially irregular in nature. However, the storm quickly intensified on May 18, strengthening into a severe cyclonic storm and later very severe cyclonic storm. During this time, the cyclone turned eastward under the influence of a ridge over India to the north.

A buoy near the storm's center recorded a pressure of 994 mbar (29.4 inHg) on May 18, the lowest recorded pressure in association with the storm. Convection increased around the center and organized into a distinct eye. The JTWC upgraded the cyclone to the equivalent of a minimal hurricane at 00:00 UTC on May 19, estimating peak 1 minute sustained winds of 120 km/h (75 mph). The IMD assessed a much higher intensity, estimating peak 3 minute winds of 165 km/h (105 mph) at 03:00 UTC that day. About an hour later, the cyclone made landfall at peak intensity with an estimated pressure of 952 mbar (28.1 inHg) in northwestern Myanmar near Sittwe, near the country's border with Bangladesh. It weakened gradually over land, dissipating over Myanmar late on May 19.

== Impact ==
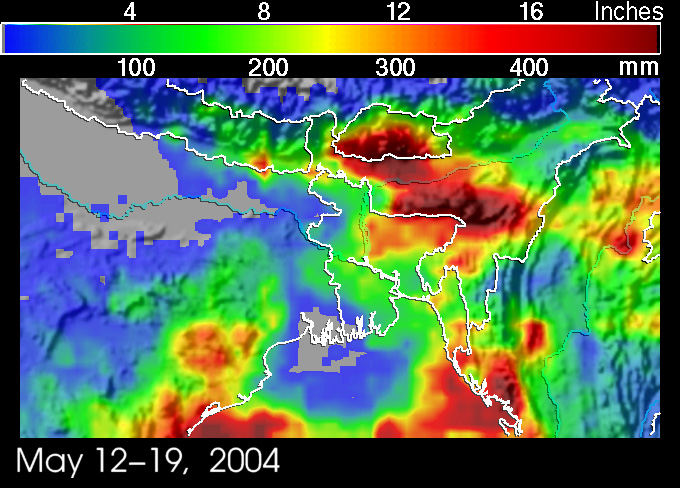
Tropical Rainfall Measuring Mission map of the estimated rainfall related to the cyclone

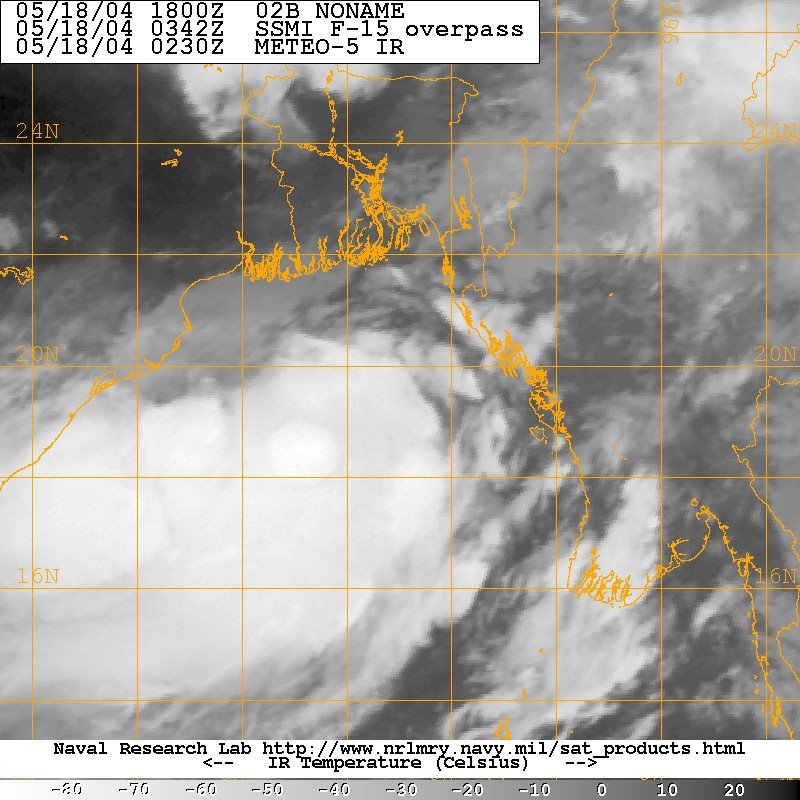
Another satellite image of the storm in the northern Bay of Bengal

While stalling in the Bay of Bengal, the cyclone's outskirts dropped light to moderate rainfall along the eastern coast of India. In Odisha, two locations reported daily rainfall totals of 40 mm (1.6 in). Upon making landfall, the cyclone's effects spread into southeastern Bangladesh, where heavy rainfall and high winds forced about 50,000 people to evacuate to shelters. The winds also knocked down trees and power lines. Two boats sank off Cox's Bazar, leaving five fishermen missing. Later, the remnants of the cyclone dropped heavy rainfall in northern Thailand, reaching 112.4 mm (4.43 in) in 24 hours at the Bhumibol Dam. In the nearby Yunnan province in China, precipitation reached 75.5 mm (2.97 in) in Ruili.

=== Myanmar ===
Damage was heaviest in Myanmar where the storm moved ashore, and winds of 157 km/h (98 mph) were reported. Widespread areas reported winds of 40 km/h (25 mph). The Tropical Rainfall Measuring Mission estimated that up to 500 mm (20 in) of precipitation fell along the Bay of Bengal coast in Myanmar and Bangladesh. There were reports of waves 15 m (49 ft) in height along the coast. A high storm surge and coastal flooding inundated four towns in Rakhine State, causing damage to water systems. Flooding was visible on satellite imagery in the days following the cyclone. Eight townships in the state were affected, five of them severely.

For 10 days, Myanmar's government did not report about the cyclone, which usually under-reports on storms that affect the country. There was also little to no advanced warning of the storm. The storm destroyed over 2,650 homes and severely damaged another 1,385, leaving around 25,000 people homeless, mostly in Pauktaw. Four hospitals in the region were heavily damaged, including the one in Sittwe that was unable to continue normal operations. About 300 schools were damaged or destroyed, including 44 in Sittwe. The storm also damaged or destroyed 133 religious buildings and 176 government buildings. Across the region, high winds knocked down telephone lines and disrupted power supply. About 2,000 cattle were killed, and many rice mills were knocked down, causing a 70% increase of food prices. Transportation was disrupted after roads were washed away, which contributed to food shortages, while damaged wells caused water shortages. During the storm, 84 ships were lost at sea, in addition to a lost ocean liner, while the main harbor at Sittwe was damaged, along with several fishing piers.

The United Nations Office for the Coordination of Humanitarian Affairs considered the cyclone as the worst to hit Myanmar since 1968. Damage totaled over K621 million kyat ($99.2 million USD). (Note: The damage was originally reported in 2004 Myanmar kyat. Conversion provided by the Oanda Corporation.) Officially, there were 236 deaths in the country, although there were unconfirmed reports of a death toll as high as 1,000. In the city of Myebon alone, there were 139 deaths. Most of the deaths were fishermen from Rakhine State caught at sea.

== Aftermath ==
On May 27, the Myanmar government issued a rare appeal for aid to the international community in response to damage from the storm. The request included $220,000 (USD) worth of rice, tarpaulin sheets for temporary shelter, medicine, and clothing, to assist 14,000 people. In early June, the government issued an updated appeal to request $337,000 (USD) to help 25,000 people, after the scope of the disaster became better known. The Red Cross operation responding to the cyclone ended in December 2004, which marked the first time the agency had a major response to a disaster. It worked in conjunction with the World Food Programme, Bridge Asia Japan, and the Myanmar Maternal and Child Welfare Association, utilizing some private donations. Red Cross volunteers helped clear roads and clean ponds to return areas to normalcy. Typically, the government handles relief measures.

In the days following the storm, Myanmar's Ministry of Social Welfare, Relief and Resettlement assessed damage in the affected areas to determine needs, and also coordinated relief efforts. The local Red Cross chapter went to the worst affected villages with water, water purification tablets, blankets, and mosquito nets. Many of the affected families were unable to afford rebuilding their homes. Myanmar's National Disaster Relief Committee distributed 500 tons of concrete and 50,000 roofing sheets to help rebuild homes. By June 8, all displaced residents were either staying with relatives or returned to their homes, with the reconstruction or resettlement process expected to take up to nine months. Myanmar's then-Prime Minister Khin Nyunt surveyed the damaged areas and held a ceremony on June 7 in Sittwe, where domestic donations were transferred to the government in "the spirit of national consolidation". The Prime Minister stated that the country rarely experiences devastating cyclones due to their strong religious beliefs. A group of 35 Rohingya people from Yangon took a tour of Rakhine State after the storm, despite they are usually banned from the region. The group donated about $267,000 (USD), although due to their minority status in the country, the aid did not help other Rohingyas in the state, who also did not receive assistance from the government.

In response to the aid request, various United Nations agencies sent $175,000 (USD) worth of financial or material assistance to the country. The World Food Programme provided 50 kg (110 lb) of rice to 3,700 families for three months, and UNICEF provided medicines, corrugated sheeting, and latrine slabs. The government of Japan donated about ¥10 million worth of supplies, including blankets and water. The Chinese Red Cross donated about $20,000 (USD) worth of relief. Eight other governments and Red Cross chapters donated CHF331,432 francs worth of aid or supplies.

== See also ==
- Cyclone Nargis – devastating cyclone that struck Myanmar in 2008
- Cyclone Mala – another storm that struck the country in 2006
