= Tropical cyclones in Myanmar =

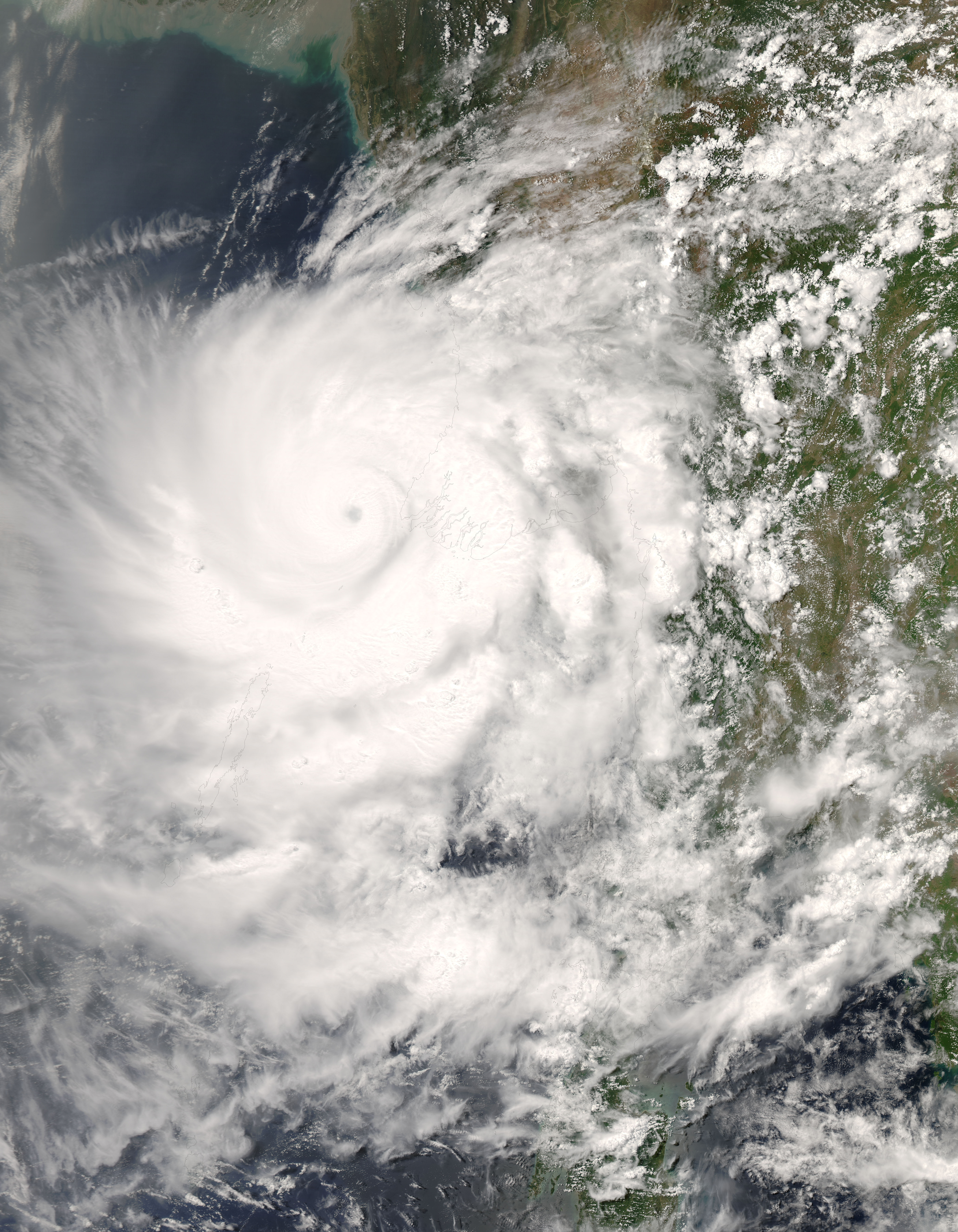
Satellite image of Cyclone Nargis approaching landfall in Myanmar on May 2

At least 29 tropical cyclones have affected Myanmar, a country adjacent to the Bay of Bengal in mainland Southeast Asia. Myanmar has witnessed some of the deadliest storms in the Bay of Bengal, including Cyclone Nargis in May 2008, which struck the low-lying Irrawaddy Delta near Yangon. Its winds and storm surge killed an estimated 140,000 people and left nearly $10 billion in damage. The country's worst natural disaster in the 20th century was a cyclone in 1968, which killed more than 1,000 people when it hit Rakhine State in northwestern Myanmar. One of the most powerful storms to ever hit the country was Cyclone Mocha, which it moved ashore northwestern Myanmar in May 2023, killing at least 413 people.

== Climatology ==
On average, a tropical cyclone makes landfall on Myanmar every year, although before 2000, the average was once every three years.

== List of storms ==
The list below contains all storms sorted by their year of formation.

=== 1900s ===
- May 9, 1968 – A cyclone struck northwestern Myanmar near Sittwe, becoming the country's worst natural disaster at the time. The storm killed at least 1,037 people, and left 297,768 people homeless after the storm destroyed more than 57,000 houses.
- November 1989 – Cyclone Gay
- May 19, 1992 – A cyclonic storm struck Rakhine State, killing at least 27 people. The storm destroyed 433 homes and also killed many livestock.
- November 21, 1992 – Cyclone Forrest made landfall in Rakhine State with winds of 155–175 km/h (96–109 mph).
- May 2, 1994 – A powerful cyclone hit southeastern Bangladesh, killing 17 people in Myanmar. The storm damaged or destroyed 8,872 houses, as well as dozens of schools and hospitals, with damage estimated at K60 million (US$10 million).
- November 25, 1995 - A cyclonic storm struck southeastern Bangladesh and later moved into northern Myanmar, damaging crops in Rakhine State.
- October 25, 1999 - A developing cyclonic storm brushed southwestern Myanmar, killing 10 people and displacing 10,000 families.

=== 2000s ===
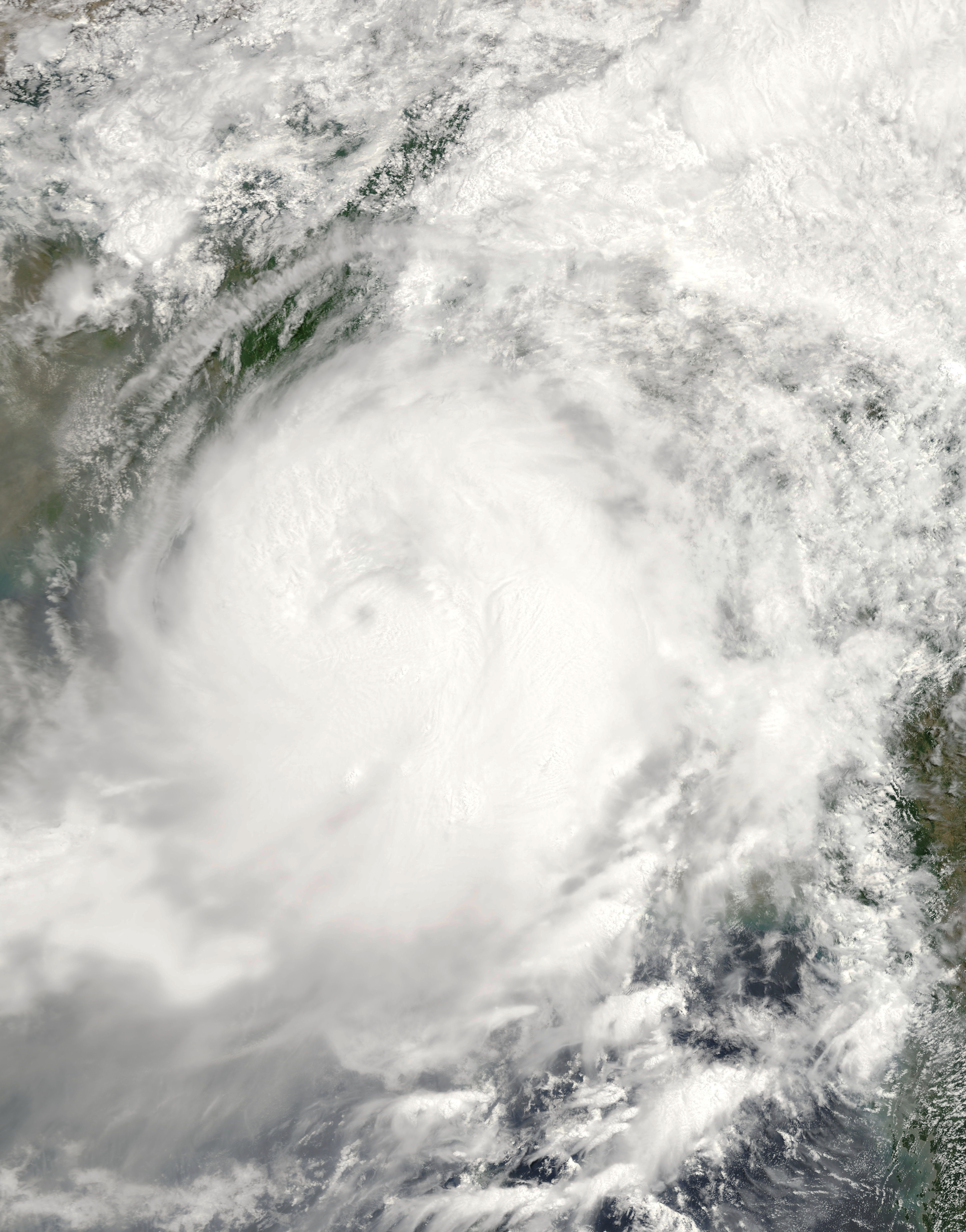
Satellite image of the 2004 cyclone that struck the country

- May 11, 2002 – A deep depression made landfall just east of Yangon, producing winds of 47 km/h (29 mph).
- May 18, 2002 – A tropical depression struck Rakhine State, according to the Thai Meteorological Department.
- May 19, 2003 – A cyclonic storm struck western Myanmar near Kyaukpyu, bringing heavy rainfall.
- May 19, 2004 – An extremely severe cyclonic storm made landfall in Rakhine State with winds of 165 km/h (105 mph). Officially, there were 236 deaths in the country, although there were unconfirmed reports of a death toll as high as 1,000. Damage totaled over K621 million kyat ($99.2 million USD). On May 27, the Myanmar government issued a rare appeal for aid to the international community in response to damage from the storm.
- April 29, 2006 – Very Severe Cyclonic Storm Mala hit Rakhine State, killing 37 people.
- May 15, 2007 – Cyclone Akash produced storm surge flooding in Rakhine State after it struck Bangladesh. including 2 hectares (4.9 acres) of destroyed lands of shrimp farms.
- May 2, 2008 – Extremely Severe Cyclonic Storm Nargis made landfall in the low-lying Irrawaddy Delta near Yangon, killing an estimated 140,000 people, making it among the deadliest tropical cyclones on record, and becoming the country's worst natural disaster on record. The IMD estimated a landfall intensity of 165 km/h (105 mph) (3-minute sustained). Nargis also produced a 3.7 m (12 ft) storm surge. Myanmar was largely unprepared for the cyclone, lacking shelters and an early warning system. The cyclone damaged or destroyed more than 700,000 homes, leaving more than 1 million people homeless. Damage was estimated at over US$10 billion. In the ten years after the cyclone, Myanmar installed radar and observation stations while improving its early warning system.
- April 17, 2009 – A tropical depression, formerly Cyclone Bijli, struck Bangladesh, and later brought heavy rainfall to northern Myanmar.
- October 22, 2010 – Extremely Severe Cyclonic Storm Giri made landfall in Rakhine State, killing 157 people, with damage estimated at Ks.2.34 billion (US$359 million). About 53,000 people evacuated ahead of the storm.
- October 20, 2011 – A deep depression moved ashore near the border of Bangladesh and Myanmar. It dropped heavy rainfall, causing floods in northwestern Myanmar that killed 215 people.
- May 16, 2013 – A cyclonic storm, operationally named Mahasen and later renamed Viyaru, struck Bangladesh, bringing rainfall and high waves to northwestern Myanmar. Ahead of the storm, nearly 70,000 people evacuated.
- October 2013 – Phailin
- July 30, 2015 – After forming near the coast of Bangladesh, Cyclone Komen moved back over land, bringing heavy rainfall to northwestern Myanmar after weeks of monsoonal floods. The storm killed 39 people and caused an estimated K1.942 trillion (US$1.51 billion) in damage.
- May 2016 – Roanu
- August 20, 2016 – Tropical Depression Dianmu moved through northern Myanmar days after striking northern Vietnam.
- October 2016 – Kyant
- April 16, 2017 – Cyclonic Storm Maarutha struck Rakhine State, becoming the first ever recorded April landfall in the country. Maarutha killed four people in Ayeyarwady Region.
- May 30, 2017 – Cyclone Mora struck southeastern Bangladesh, killing four people in Myanmar, including two from a tornado. Mora damaged or destroyed over 19,000 buildings.
- May 29, 2018 – A deep depression hit Rakhine State, causing winds and rains that destroyed more than 500 houses.

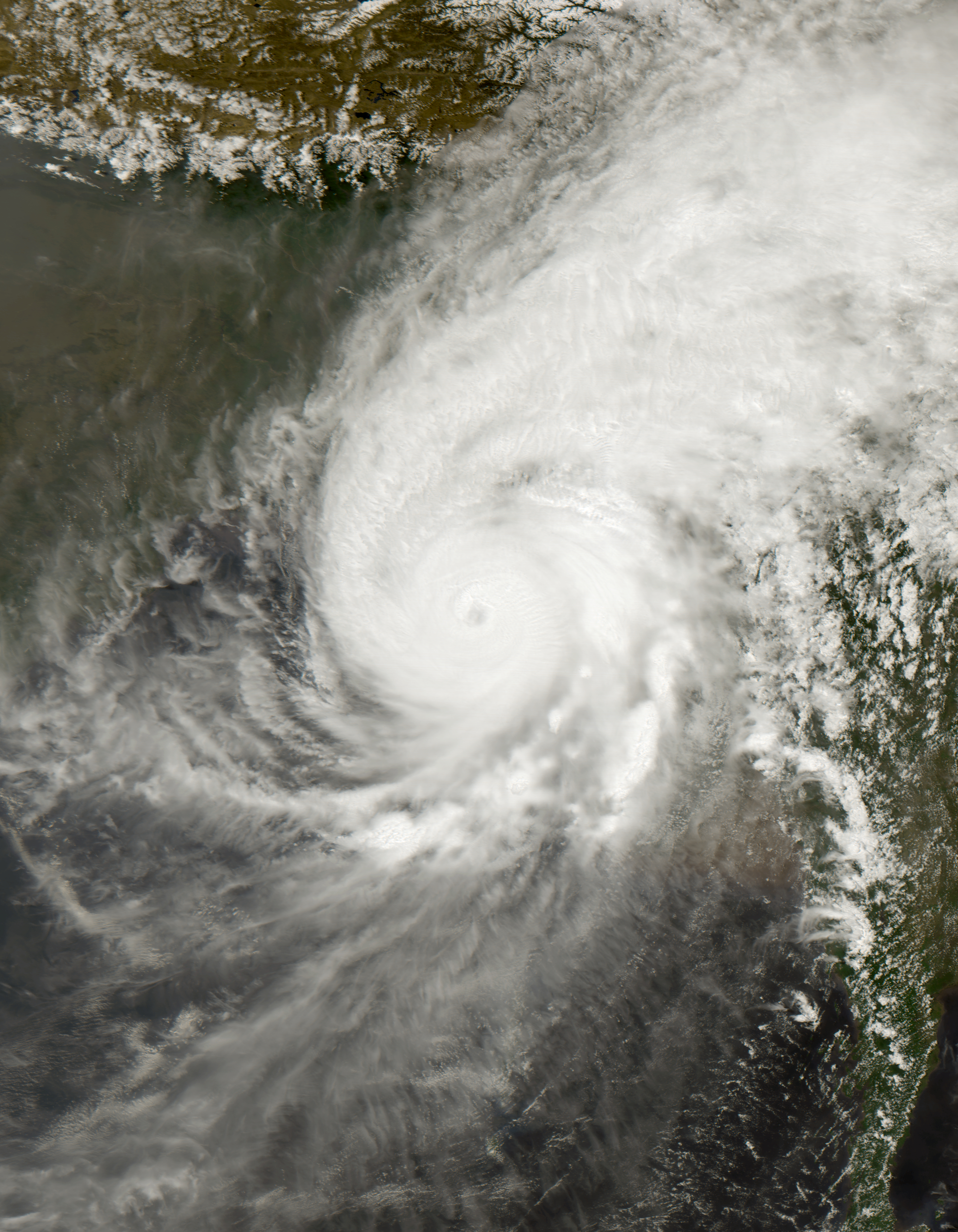
Cyclone Mocha approaching western Myanmar in May 2023

- March 22, 2022 – A deep depression moved ashore western Myanmar, becoming the first system to do so during April. It dropped heavy rainfall in the Coco Islands.
- May 20, 2022 – A depression struck southeastern Myanmar near Mawlamyine, bringing heavy rainfall to the region.
- May 14, 2023 – Extremely Severe Cyclonic Storm Mocha made landfall just north of Sittwe with 3-minute sustained winds of 215 km/h (135 mph). Mocha killed at least 413 people in the country, with hundreds of people missing.
- September 8, 2024 – The remnants of Typhoon Yagi in the Pacific moved into the country, bringing rainfall and causing massive landslides across the country, killing 433 and leaving 79 others missing.

== Climatological statistics ==
Storms affecting Myanmar by month
Month	Number of storms
March	1
April	3
May	15
June	0
July	1
August	1
October	5
November	3

Storms affecting Myanmar by period
Period	Number of storms
1960s	1
1980s	1
1990s	5
2000s	8
2010s	11
2020s	3

== See also ==
- List of Bangladesh tropical cyclones
- Tropical cyclones in India
- List of tropical cyclones in Pakistan
