= 2004 North Indian Ocean cyclone season =

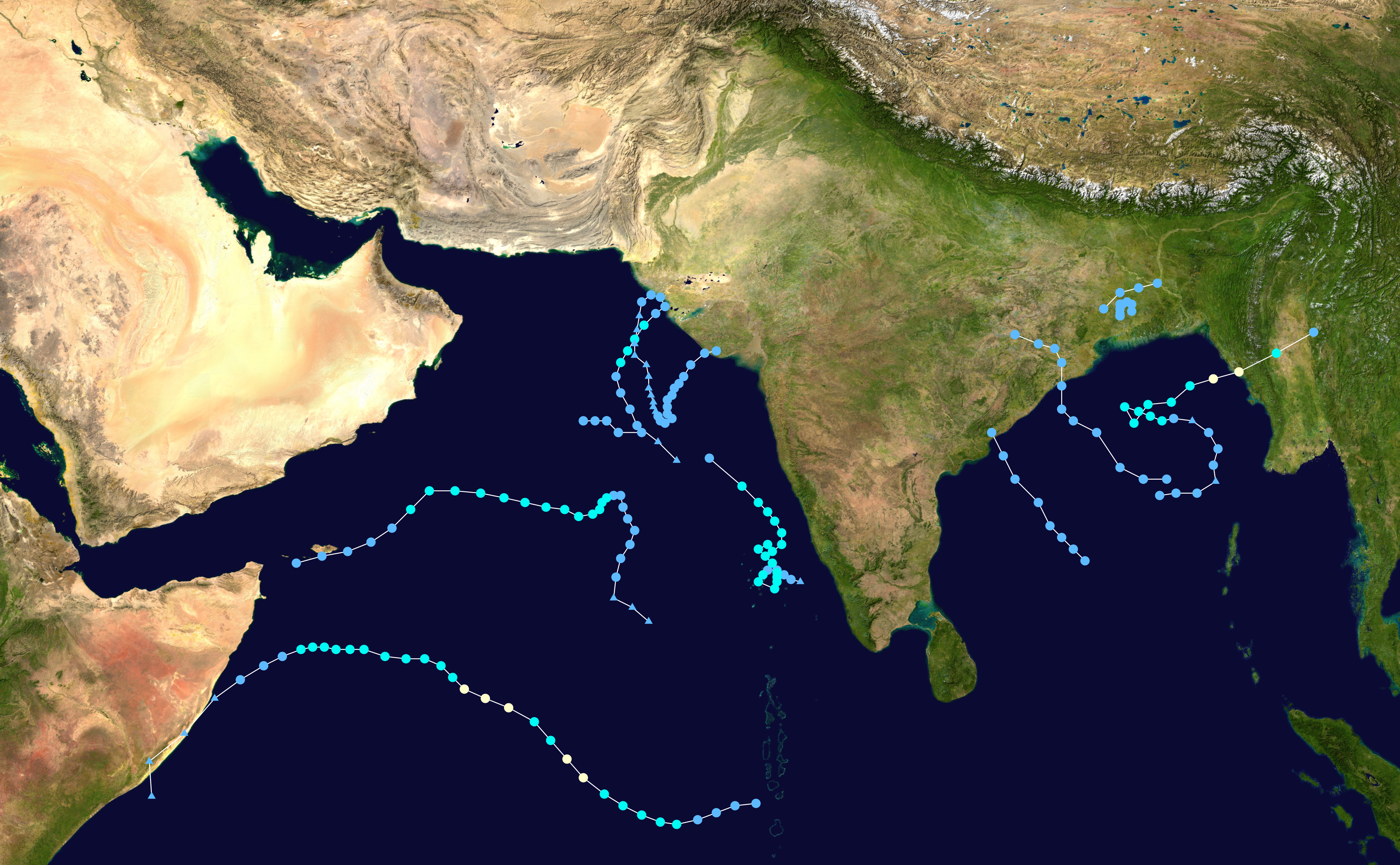
- Season summary map

Seasonal boundaries
- First system formed: May 5, 2004
- Last system dissipated: December 2, 2004

Strongest storm
- Name: BOB 01
  - Maximum winds: 165 km/h (105 mph) (3-minute sustained)
  - Lowest pressure: 952 hPa (mbar)

Seasonal statistics
- Depressions: 9
- Deep depressions: 7
- Cyclonic storms: 4
- Severe cyclonic storms: 4
- Very severe cyclonic storms: 1
- Extremely severe cyclonic storms: 1
- Total fatalities: 587 total
- Total damage: $129.8 million (2004 USD)

Related articles
- 2004 Atlantic hurricane season; 2004 Pacific hurricane season; 2004 Pacific typhoon season

The 2004 North Indian Ocean cyclone season was the first in which tropical cyclones were officially named in the basin. Cyclone Onil, which struck India and Pakistan, was named in late September. The final storm, Cyclone Agni, became one of the storms closest to the equator. The season was fairly active, with ten depressions forming from May to November. The India Meteorological Department designated four of these as cyclonic storms, which have maximum sustained winds of at least 65 km/h (40 mph) averaged over three minutes. The Joint Typhoon Warning Center also issued warnings for five of the storms on an unofficial basis.

In early May, two tropical storms formed in the basin The first formed on May 5 and meandered while intensifying, dropping 1,840 mm (72 in) in Aminidivi in the Lakshadweep group offshore western India, which was the highest daily rainfall total in the basin. A week later, a cyclone – the strongest of the season – struck Myanmar, killing 236 people and leaving 25,000 people homeless. Depressions also formed on opposite sides of India in June. A depression in September killed 59 people after dropping torrential rainfall over Bangladesh and adjacent West Bengal. In October, another depression struck the region, killing 273 people. A short-lived cyclonic storm would form in the Arabian Sea in November.

== Season summary ==
The India Meteorological Department (IMD) was designated a Regional Specialized Meteorological Center by the World Meteorological Organization in July 1988 to monitor and warn on tropical cyclones in the northern Indian Ocean. The basin is defined between 45° and 100° E, and north of the equator. The agency also used geostationary satellites and a network of buoys to track the storms, and utilized various tropical cyclone forecast models to predict future tracks. The American-based Joint Typhoon Warning Center (JTWC) also issued warnings for storms in the basin on an unofficial basis.

The monsoon became active in May as water temperatures became warm. Twin depressions formed during June on opposite sides of India, which helped intensify the monsoon over the country. A notable feature of the season was the Arabian Sea being more active than the Bay of Bengal. The IMD began naming tropical cyclones within the basin in 2004, beginning after the monsoon season. As such, only two cyclonic storms in the latter half of the year were named.

== Systems ==
=== Severe Cyclonic Storm ARB 01 ===
- Severe cyclonic storm (IMD)
- Tropical storm (SSHWS)
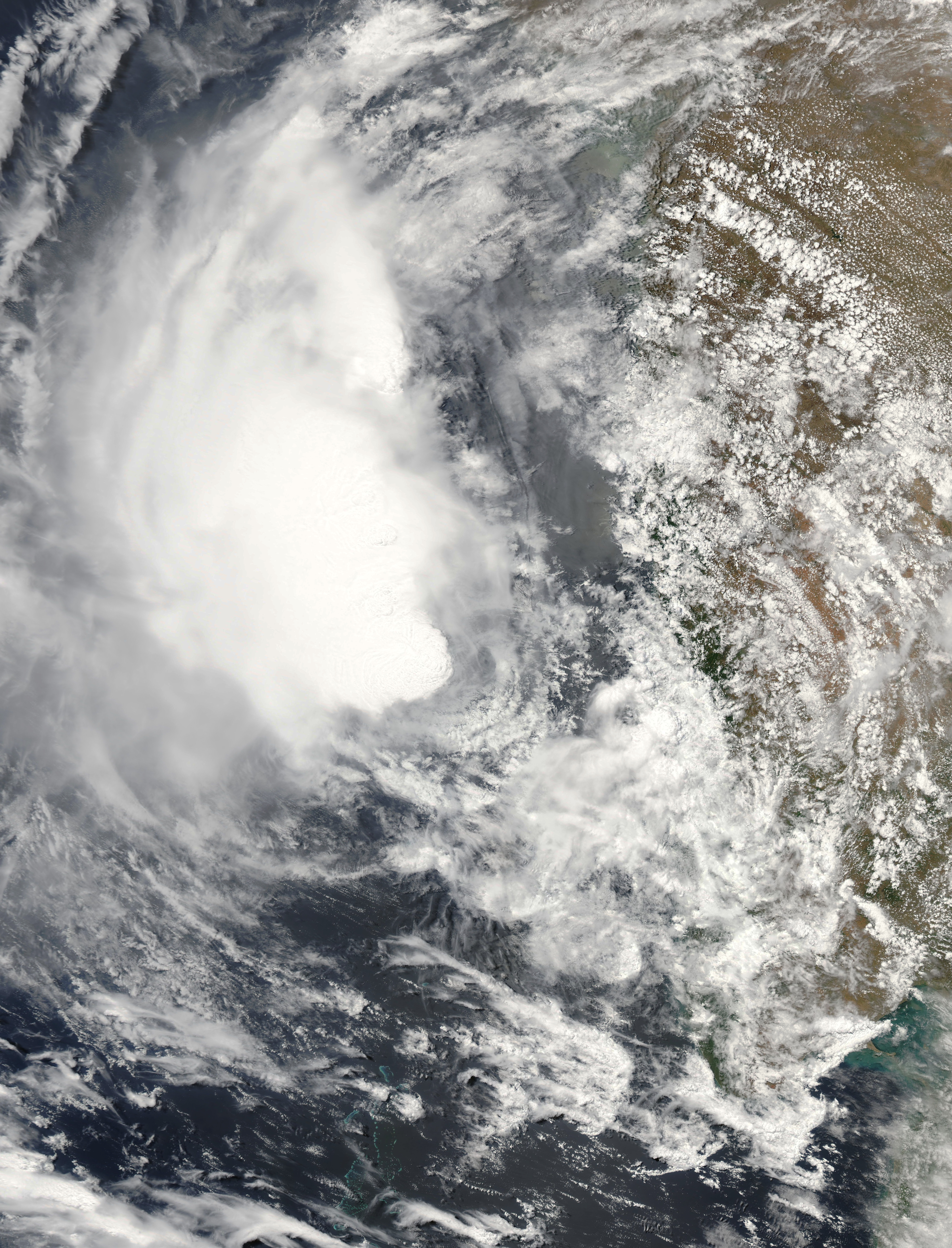
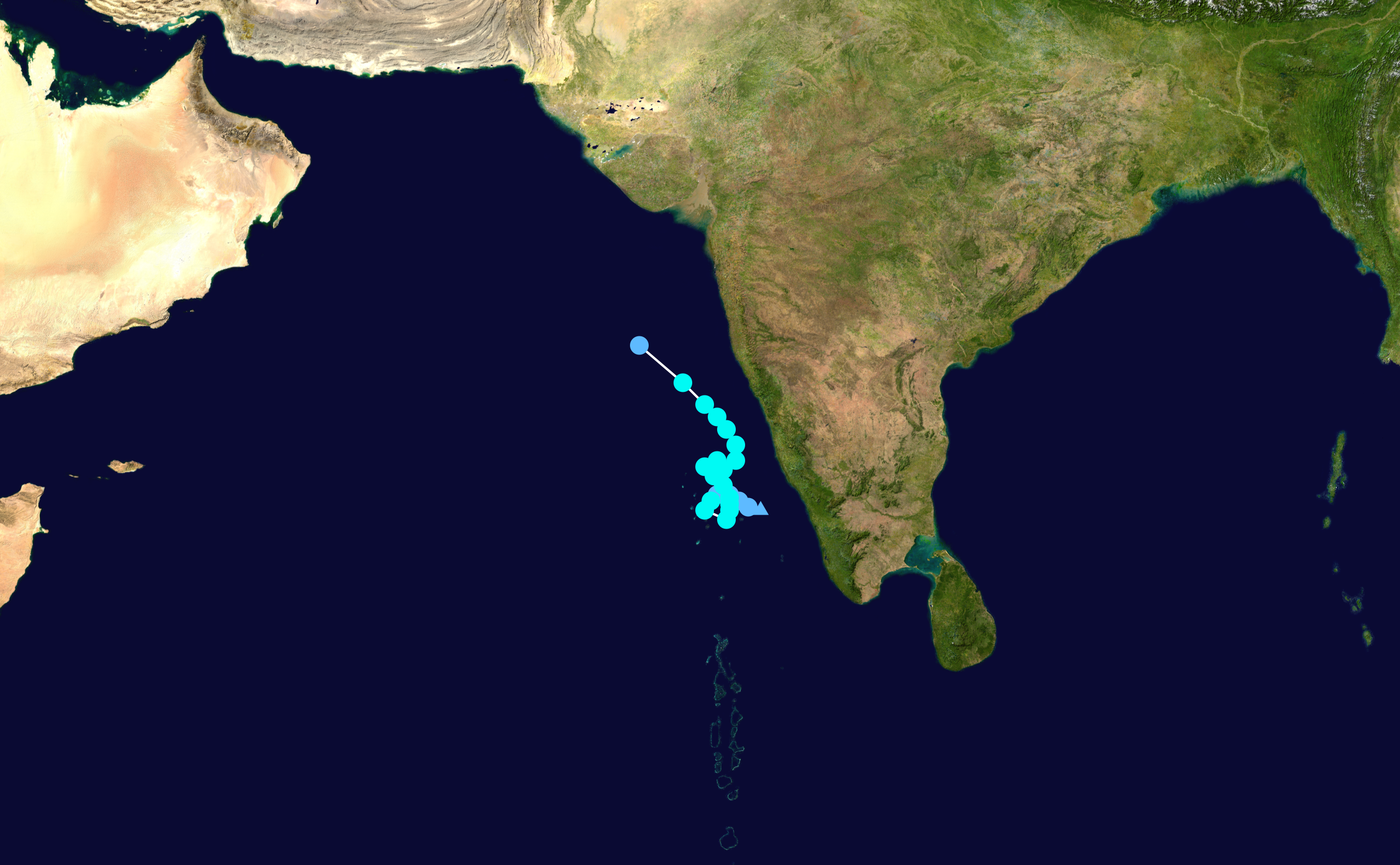
- Duration: May 5 – May 10
- Peak intensity: 100 km/h (65 mph) (3-min); 984 hPa (mbar)

Toward the end of April, an area of convection persisted in the southern Bay of Bengal. It developed into a distinct low-pressure area on May 1 over the body of water, but soon moved westward into India without developing. On May 4, the system emerged from Kerala into the Arabian Sea, and soon after convection rapidly increased. Early on May 5, the JTWC classified the system as Tropical Cyclone 01A about 370 km (230 mi) west-southwest of Kochi, India. On the same day, the IMD began classifying it as a depression, but soon after upgraded it to a deep depression and later cyclonic storm after increased organization. The storm meandered off southwest India for three days due to weak steering currents. During that time, the convection pulsed around the circulation, and the IMD upgraded it to a severe cyclonic storm on May 7 with winds of 100 km/h (60 mph). By contrast, the JTWC only estimated peak winds of 85 km/h (55 mph). Increased wind shear, cooler waters, and dry air rapidly weakened the convection, exposing the center and causing the storm to deteriorate quickly into a depression. On May 10, the system degenerated into a remnant low off Gujarat, without any discernible low-level circulation.

The precursor to the storm brought heavy rainfall to southern India, reaching 124.8 mm (4.91 in) in Thiruvananthapuram over 48 hours. The remnants also brought upwards of 225 mm (8.9 in) of rainfall in Gujarat. While an active tropical cyclone, the storm dropped torrential rainfall to the Lakshadweep group offshore western India. Aminidivi recorded 1,840 mm (72 in) over three days, including 1,170 mm (46 in) in just 24 hours. This broke the record for the highest daily rainfall total related to a North Indian Ocean cyclone. The high rains cut communications from the island group to the mainland, and damaged 45 houses in conjunction with the winds. High waves sank 15 boats and one cargo ship while also causing erosion in Kerala. The storm killed nine people and caused ₹300 million rupees (6.7 million USD).

=== Extremely Severe Cyclonic Storm BOB 01 ===
- Extremely severe cyclonic storm (IMD)
- Category 1 tropical cyclone (SSHWS)
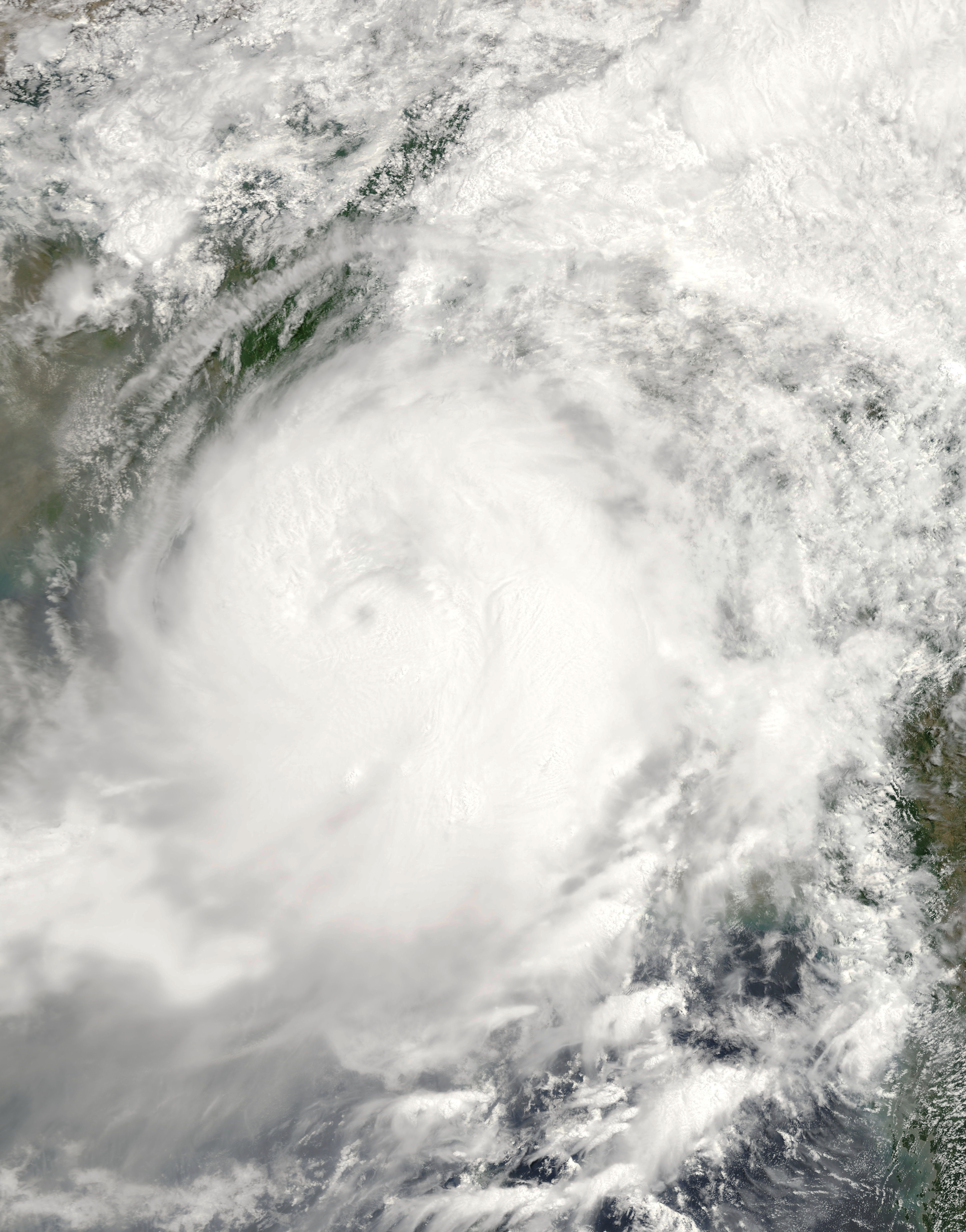
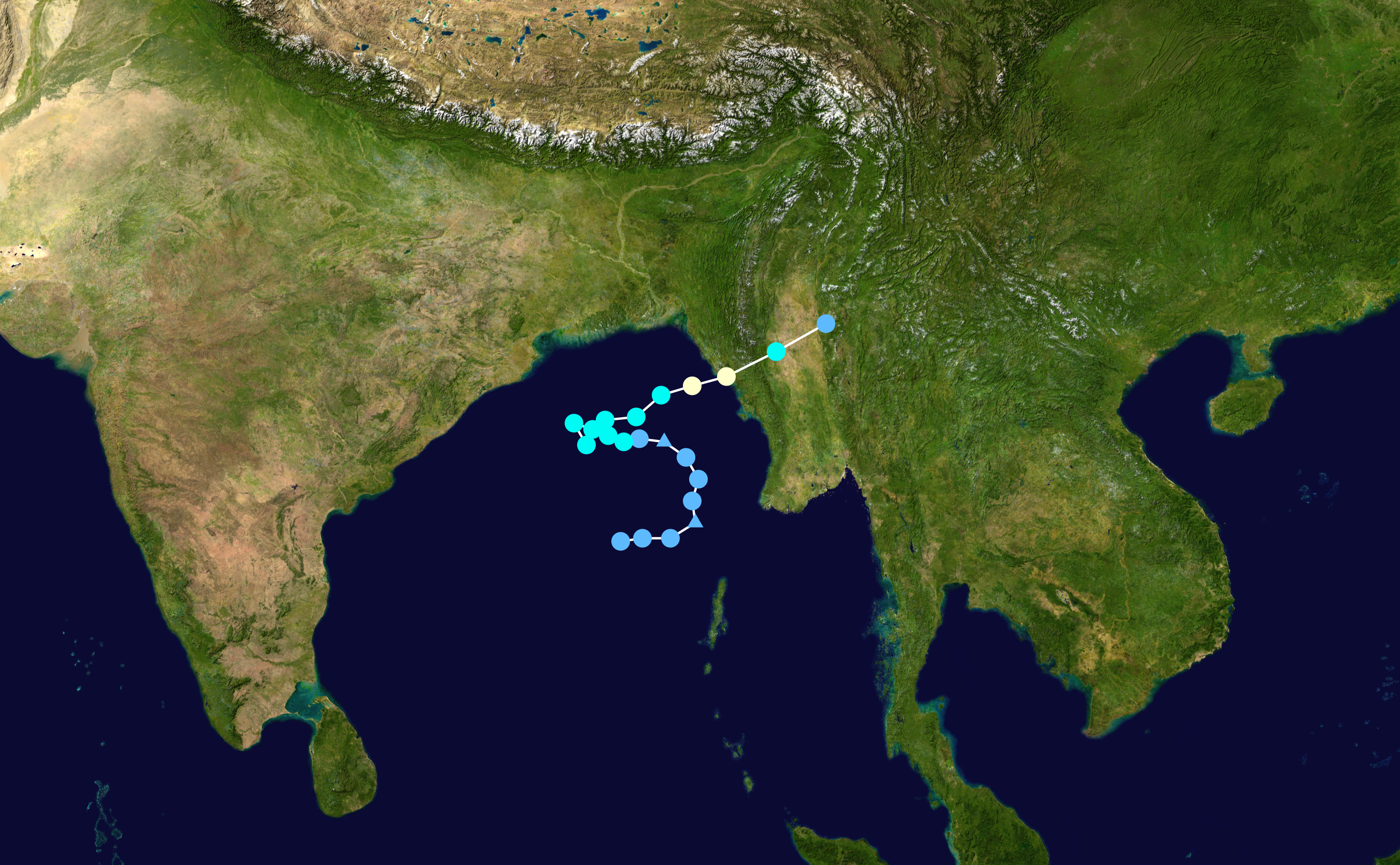
- Duration: May 16 – May 19
- Peak intensity: 165 km/h (105 mph) (3-min); 952 hPa (mbar)

The second storm of the season formed as a depression on May 16 in the central Bay of Bengal. With low wind shear and a surge in the monsoon trough, the storm intensified while meandering over open waters. The storm eventually began a steady northeastward motion due to a ridge to the north over India. While approaching land, an eye developed in the center of the storm, indicative of a strong cyclone. On May 19, the cyclone made landfall along northwestern Myanmar near Sittwe, with maximum sustained winds estimated at 165 km/h (105 mph) by the IMD. The storm rapidly weakened over land, although its remnants spread rainfall into northern Thailand and Yunnan province in China.

Winds from the cyclone reached 157 km/h (98 mph) in Myanmar, occurring in conjunction with heavy rainfall and a high storm surge. Despite the storm's ferocity, the government did not report about the cyclone for ten days, as they usually under report on landfalling storms. The cyclone caused heavy damage throughout Rakhine State, destroying or heavily damaging 4,035 homes and leaving 25,000 people homeless. There was widespread crop damage, resulting in food shortages, and damaged roads disrupted subsequent relief efforts. Damage in Myanmar totaled over K621 million kyat (US$99.2 million), making it the worst storm in the country since 1968, and there were 236 deaths. Although damage was heaviest in Myanmar, the cyclone's effects also spread into neighboring Bangladesh, where strong winds knocked over trees and capsized two ships.

=== Deep Depression ARB 02 ===
- Deep depression (IMD)
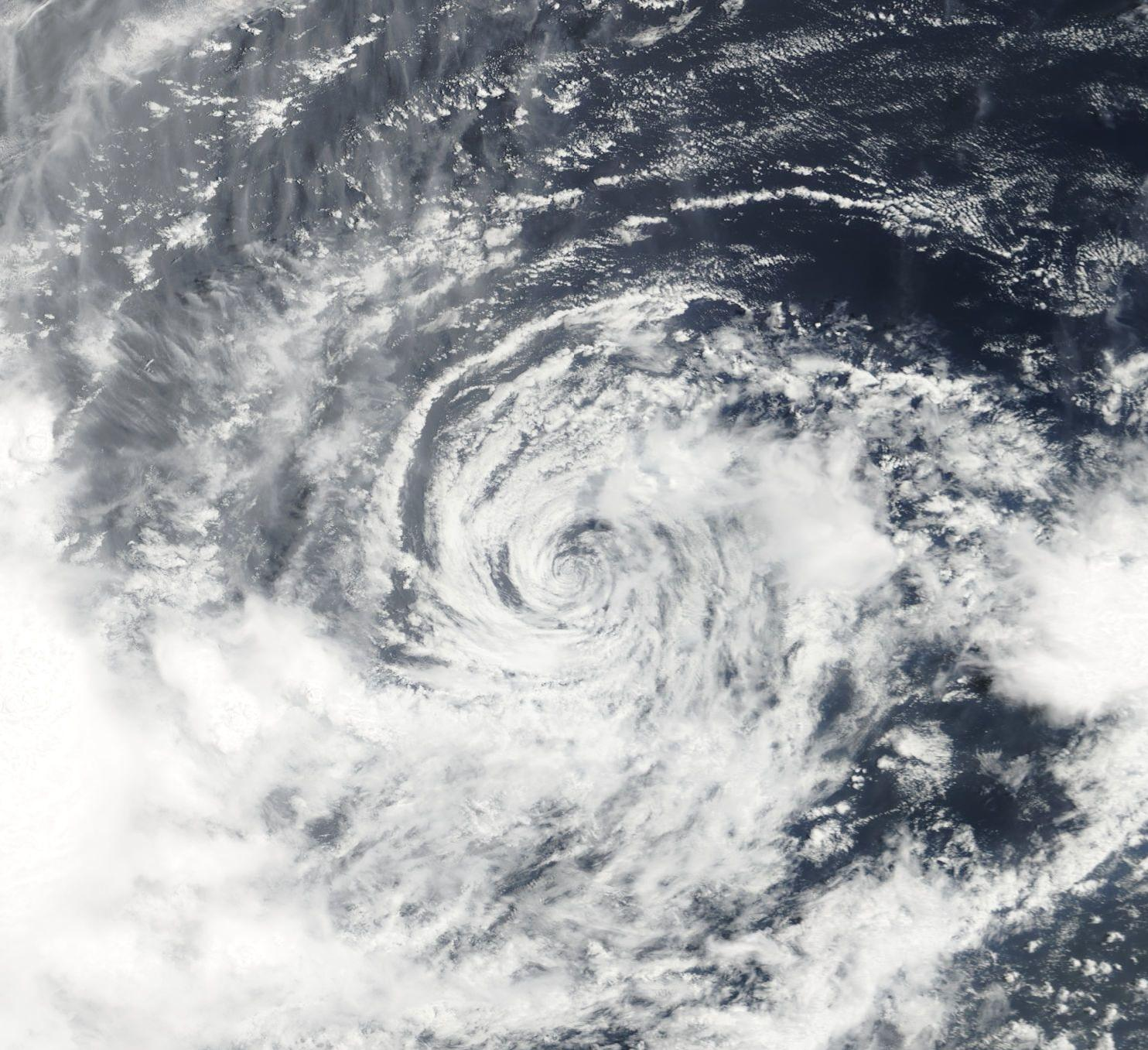
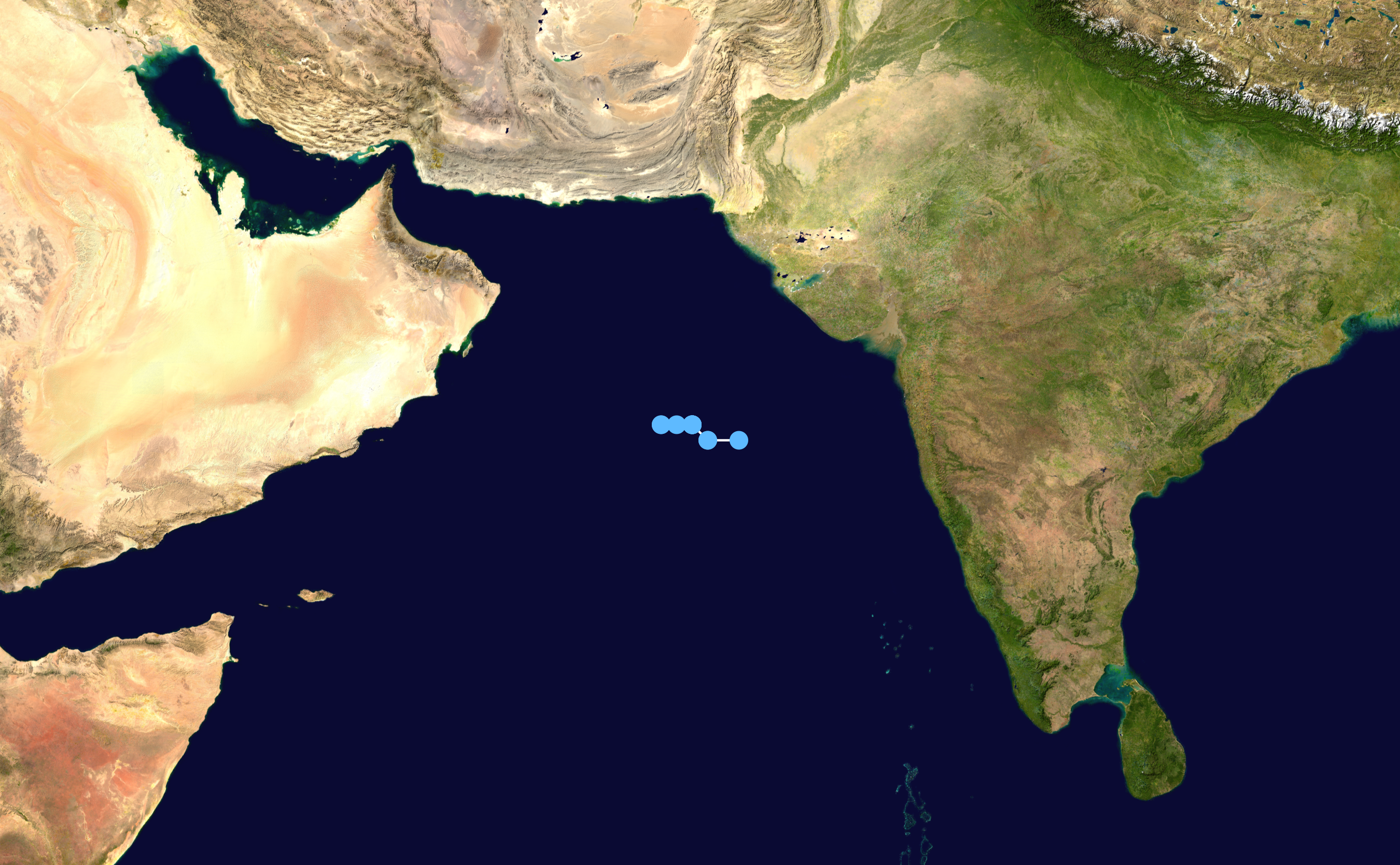
- Duration: June 10 – June 13
- Peak intensity: 55 km/h (35 mph) (3-min); 992 hPa (mbar)

On June 8, a low-pressure area formed in the eastern Arabian Sea. A nearby buoy recorded winds of 45 km/h (30 mph), which organized into a depression on June 10. While remaining nearly stationary, the depression quickly intensified into a deep depression. The system later began a slow westward movement, due to a ridge to the north. On June 11, and again on the following day, the JTWC issued a Tropical Cyclone Formation Alert (TCFA), although the system never strengthened beyond its initial stages. Strong wind shear caused the depression to weaken, and the IMD downgraded it to a remnant low on June 13.

=== Deep Depression BOB 02 ===
- Deep depression (IMD)
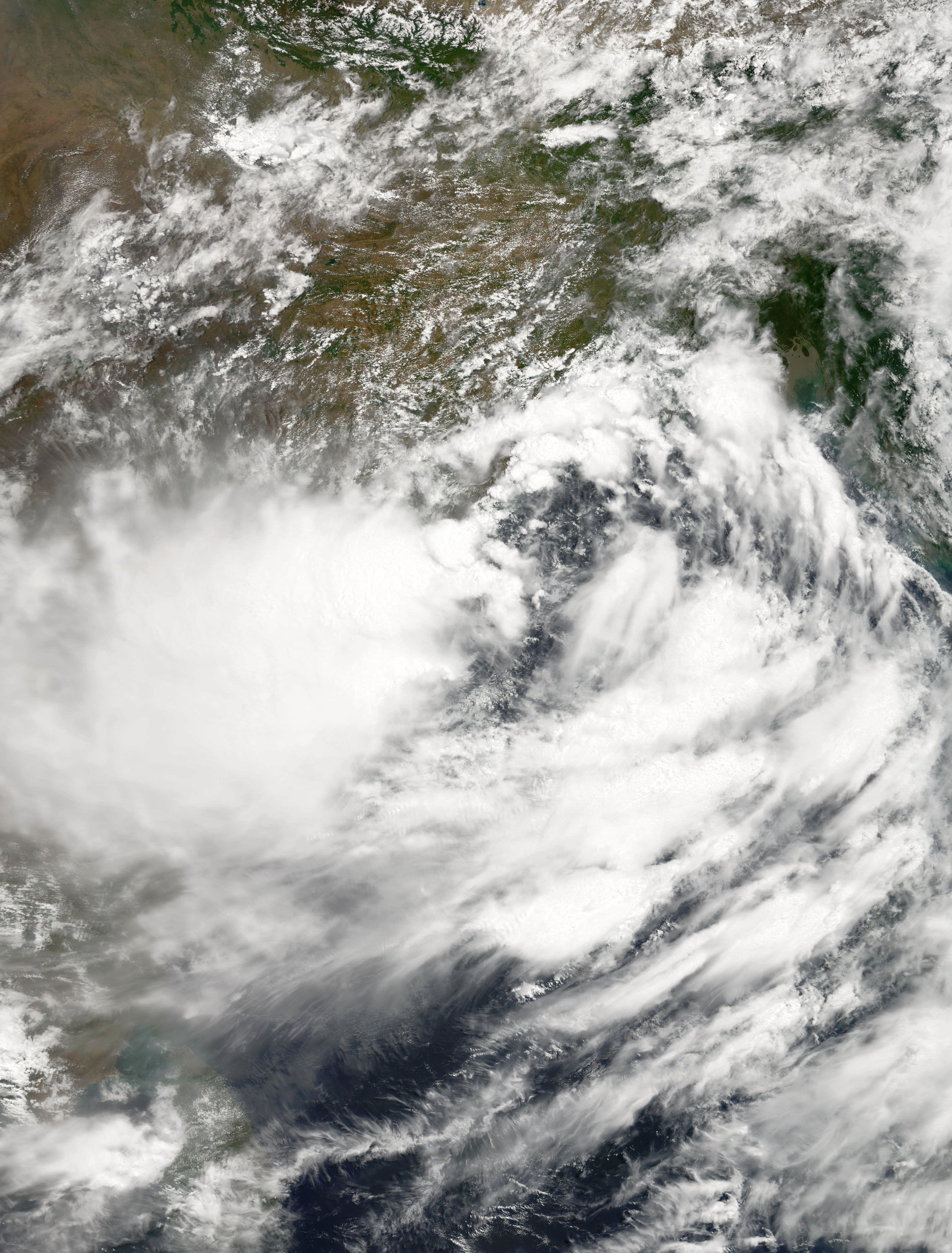
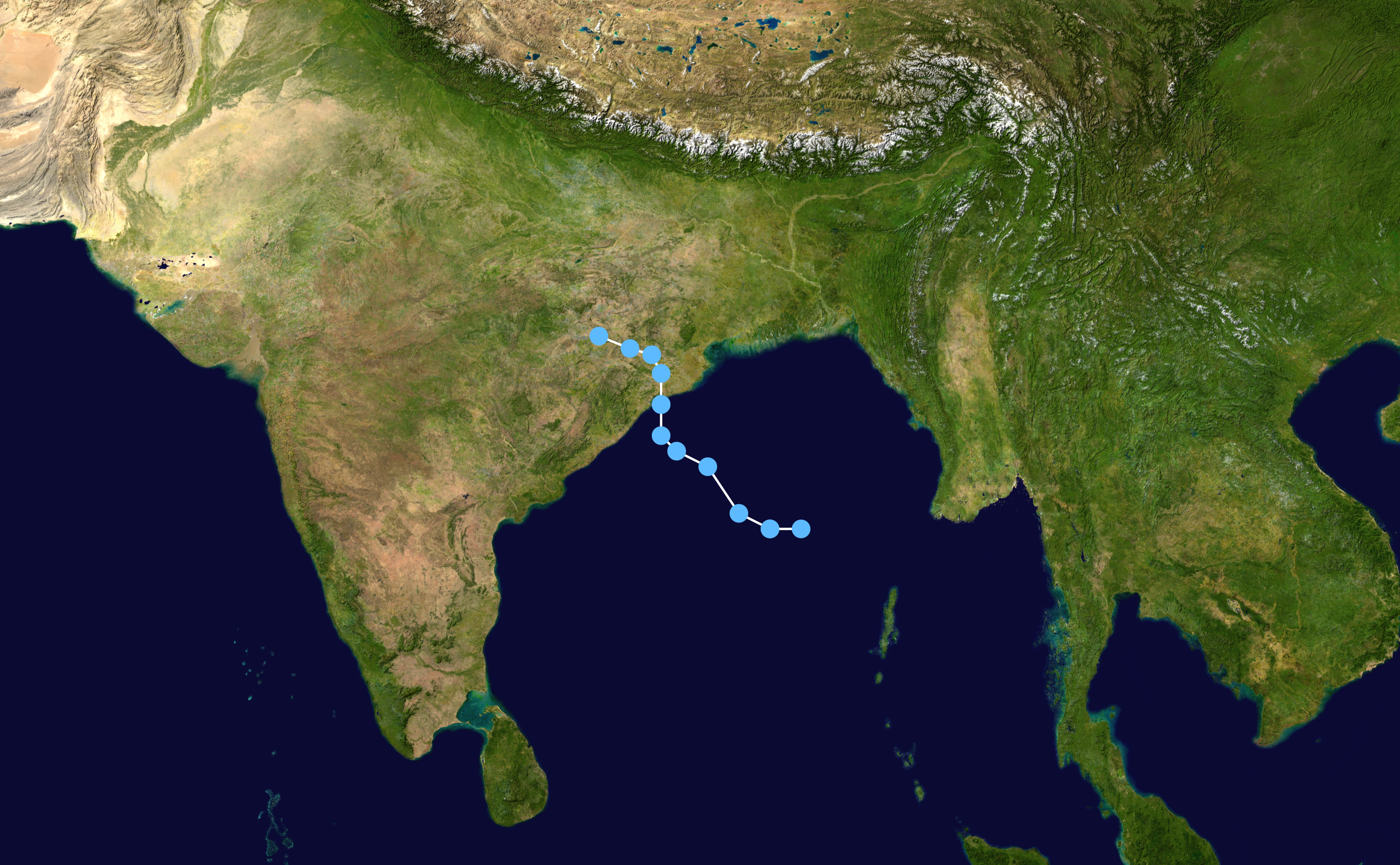
- Duration: June 11 – June 14
- Peak intensity: 55 km/h (35 mph) (3-min); 992 hPa (mbar)

A surge in the monsoon developed an area of convection over the Andaman Sea in early June, spawning a low-pressure area, which later became a depression on June 11. Moving to the northwest along a ridge, it strengthened into a deep depression the next day. Early on June 13, the system struck Odisha near Puri, and initially maintained its intensity over land. However, it eventually weakened, degenerating into a remnant low over Chhattisgarh on June 14. The depression dropped heavy rainfall in eastern India, particularly Odisha. There, the peak 24-hour precipitation total was 320 mm (13 in) in Madanpur Rampur. There were no reports of damage.

=== Land Depression 01 ===
- Depression (IMD)
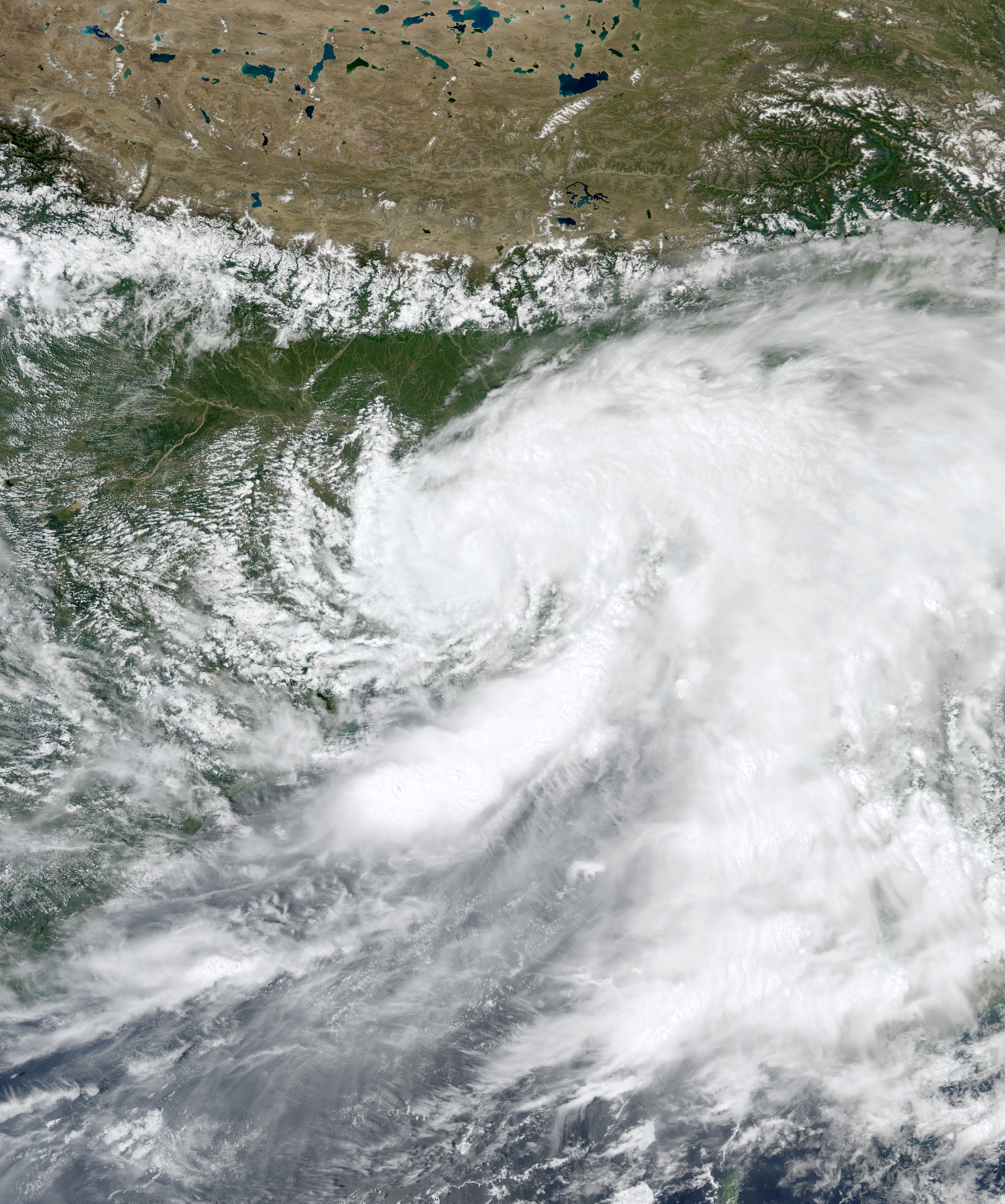
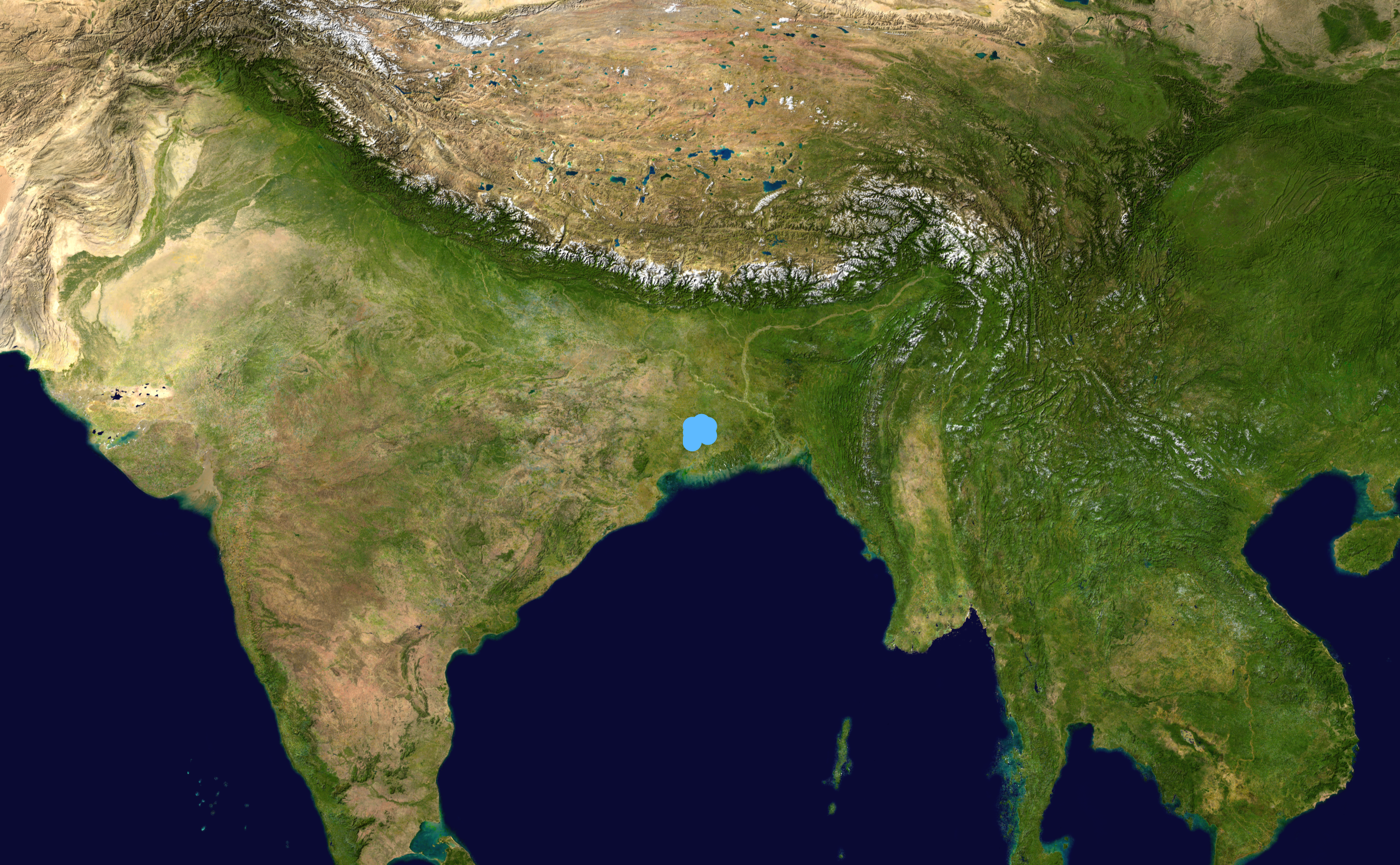
- Duration: September 12 – September 15
- Peak intensity: 45 km/h (30 mph) (3-min); 996 hPa (mbar)

For about ten days in September, a monsoon depression persisted around the northern edge of the Bay of Bengal onto adjacent landmasses, initially associated with an upper-level low. On September 10, a low-pressure area developed within the monsoon trough in the extreme northern Bay of Bengal. Moving northwestward, it organized into a depression after it moved ashore, organizing over West Bengal near Kolkata. The system attained peak winds of 45 km/h (30 mph) despite being over land. Located within a col, or weakness between ridges, the depression meandered over eastern India, weakening into a remnant low on September 15. It moved slowly northwestward, reaching Uttar Pradesh by September 22.

The depression dropped heavy rainfall in eastern India, including as a tropical cyclone, a precursor, and its remnant. Notable rainfall totals include 340 mm (13 in) in Chepan on September 9, 480 mm (19 in) on September 21 at a station in Uttar Pradesh, and 341 mm (13.4 in) in Dhaka in neighboring Bangladesh, the heaviest daily total in 50 years. Flash flooding in the Indian state of Tripura killed four people and isolated about 55,000 people. Three people died in West Bengal, where floodwaters left about 650,000 people homeless in hundreds of villages. Flash flooding in Uttar Pradesh killed 33 people overnight on September 21. In nearby Bangladesh, the depression produced additional flooding after a similar disaster occurred in July, temporarily isolating about 1 million people, and killing 19.

=== Severe Cyclonic Storm Onil ===
- Severe cyclonic storm (IMD)
- Tropical storm (SSHWS)
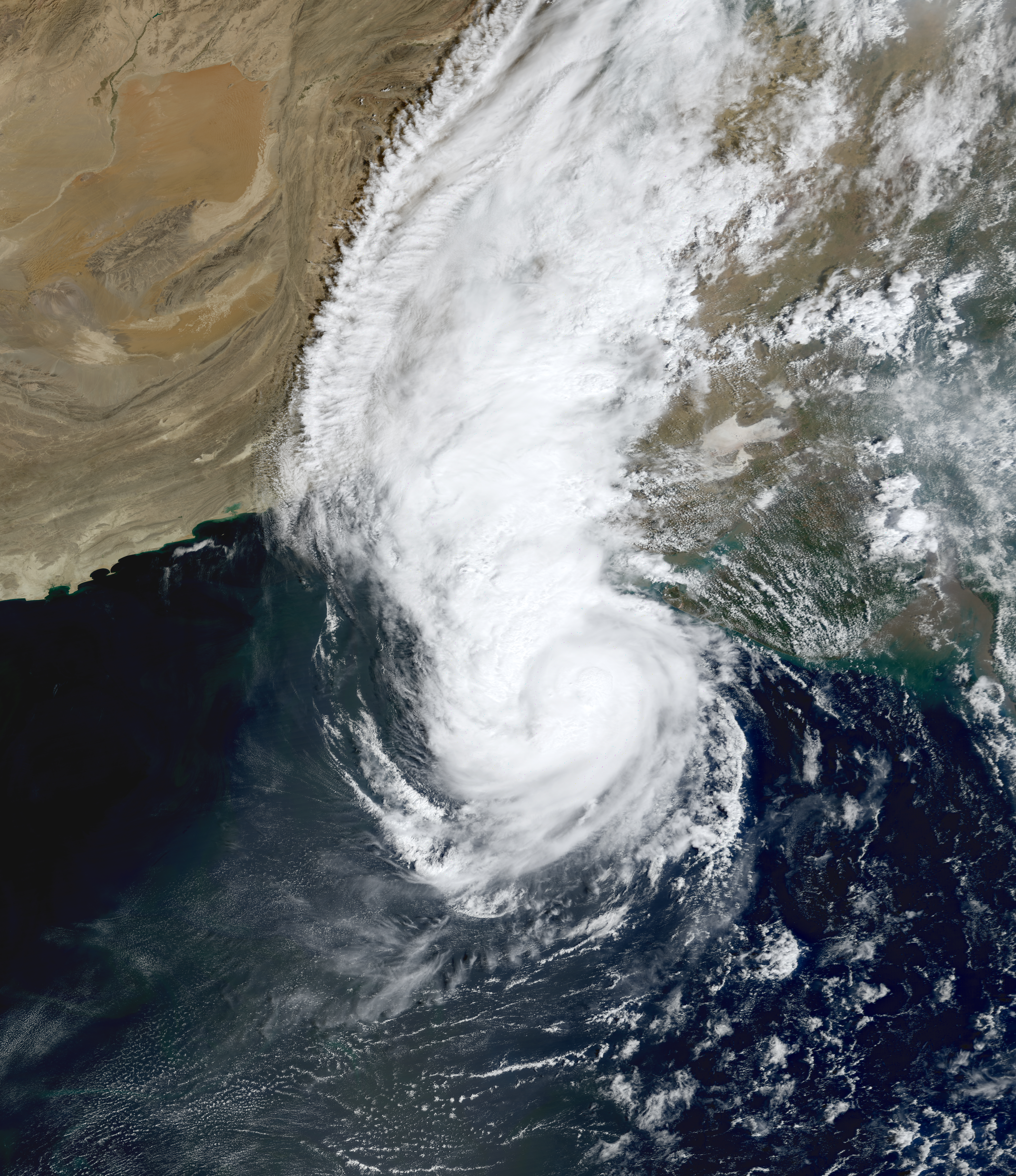
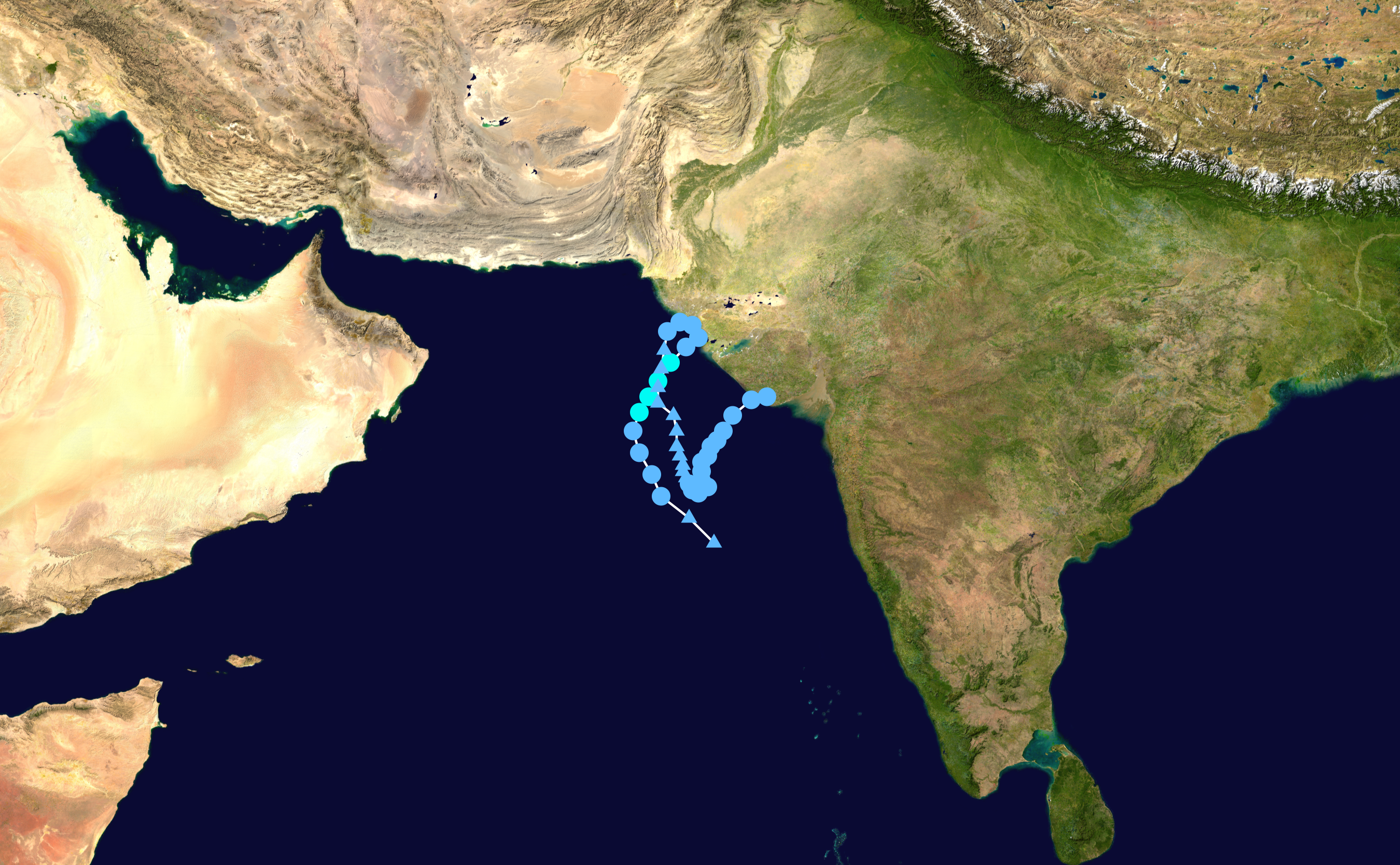
- Duration: September 30 – October 3
- Peak intensity: 100 km/h (65 mph) (3-min); 990 hPa (mbar)

A depression formed out of an area of convection southwest of India on September 30. The next day, it intensified into Cyclonic Storm Onil. (Note: The name Onil (Bengali: অনিল, [ˈo.nil]) was contributed by Bangladesh and means "air, wind" in Bengali.) becoming the first tropical cyclone on record to be named in the northern Indian Ocean. Cyclone Onil quickly attained its peak intensity on October 2 with winds of 100 km/h (60 mph) and a barometric pressure of 990 mbar (hPa; 29.23 inHg). However, dry air quickly entered the system, causing it to rapidly weaken to a depression just off the coast of Gujarat, India. Over the following several days, the system took a slow, erratic track towards the south-southeast. After turning northeastward, the system made landfall near Porbandar on October 10 and dissipated shortly thereafter.

Throughout southeastern Pakistan and northwestern India, thousands of residents were evacuated prior to the cyclone's arrival. In these areas, the storm produced moderate to heavy rainfall, peaking at 145 mm (5.7 in) in Thatta, Sindh, Pakistan. These rains led to flash flooding in several areas. Nine people died in several incidents related to the storm in Karachi. The drainage system of Hyderabad sustained significant damage, leading to several protests and demonstrations by city residents. Offshore, 300 fishermen are believed to have gone missing during the storm.

=== Depression BOB 03/04 ===
- Depression (IMD)
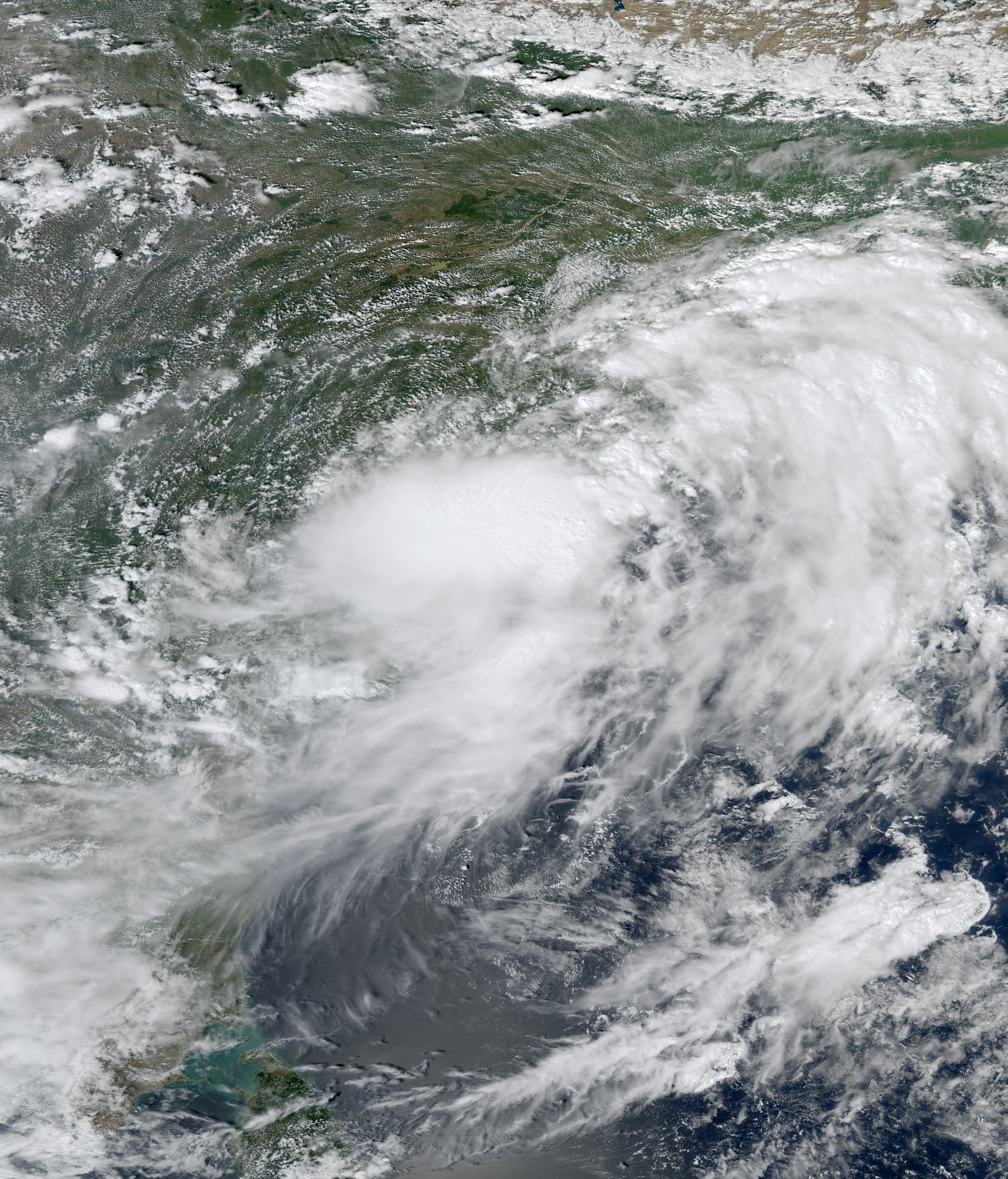
- Duration: October 2 – October 8
- Peak intensity: 45 km/h (30 mph) (3-min); 1002 hPa (mbar)

A low-pressure area formed in the Bay of Bengal on September 30 and gradually became more organized. It moved northwestward and developed into a depression on October 2. Without intensifying beyond winds of 45 km/h (30 mph), the depression moved ashore Andhra Pradesh near Kalingapatnam on October 4. It rapidly weakened into a remnant low and turned to the northeast. On October 7, the system re-intensified into a depression near Bankura despite being over land, aided by moisture from the Bay of Bengal. After crossing into northern Bangladesh, the system again weakened into a remnant low, which gradually elongated and weakened.

For several days in early October, the depression dropped rainfall across southeastern India, which was heaviest after it re-intensified over land. Alipurduar in northeastern West Bengal recorded 310 mm (12 in) in a 24-hour period, and Malda reported 430 mm (17 in) in two days. In northern Andhra Pradesh, flooding from the depression affected 40 villages, wrecking 50 houses. The waters also inundated 50,000 acres (20,000 ha) of rice paddies and damaged 200 irrigation water tanks. In West Bengal, the floods killed 3,000 migratory birds and damaged ₹1.1 billion rupees (US$23.9 million) worth of crops; 51 people also died in the state. In neighboring Odisha, four people were killed, and the floods washed away a bridge and affected several villages.

The third large flood event of the year, the depression caused its most severe impact in northeastern India, where 218 people were killed, including 112 in the city of Goalpara alone. There, the floods struck in the middle of the night, catching residents off guard and washing away hundreds of houses along two whole blocks. Flash flooding caused landslides in Kamrup, while regional and national roads were damaged or submerged. Over 15,000 people were forced to evacuate their homes to emergency shelters. Across the region, 98,721 ha (243,940 acres) of crops were damaged, and 30,000 homes were damaged or destroyed. Rainfall spread into Nepal, where 51.3 mm (2.02 in) was recorded at the airport in Kathmandu. The precipitation led to a snowstorm in Tibet, reaching 60 mm (2.4 in) in one location; this marked the highest daily snowfall for the station in October, and caused a loss of crops and livestock.

=== Deep Depression ARB 04 ===
- Deep depression (IMD)
- Tropical storm (SSHWS)
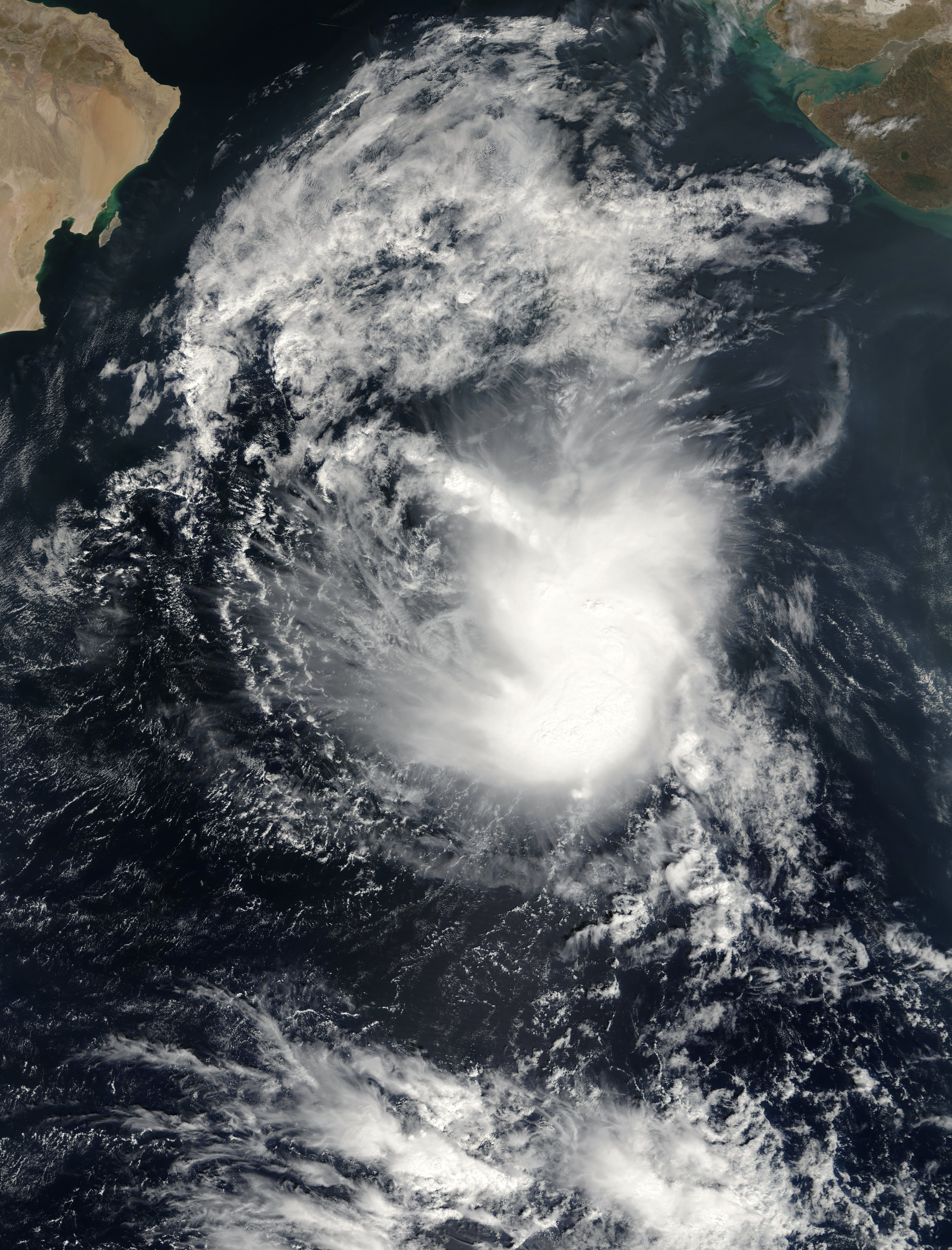
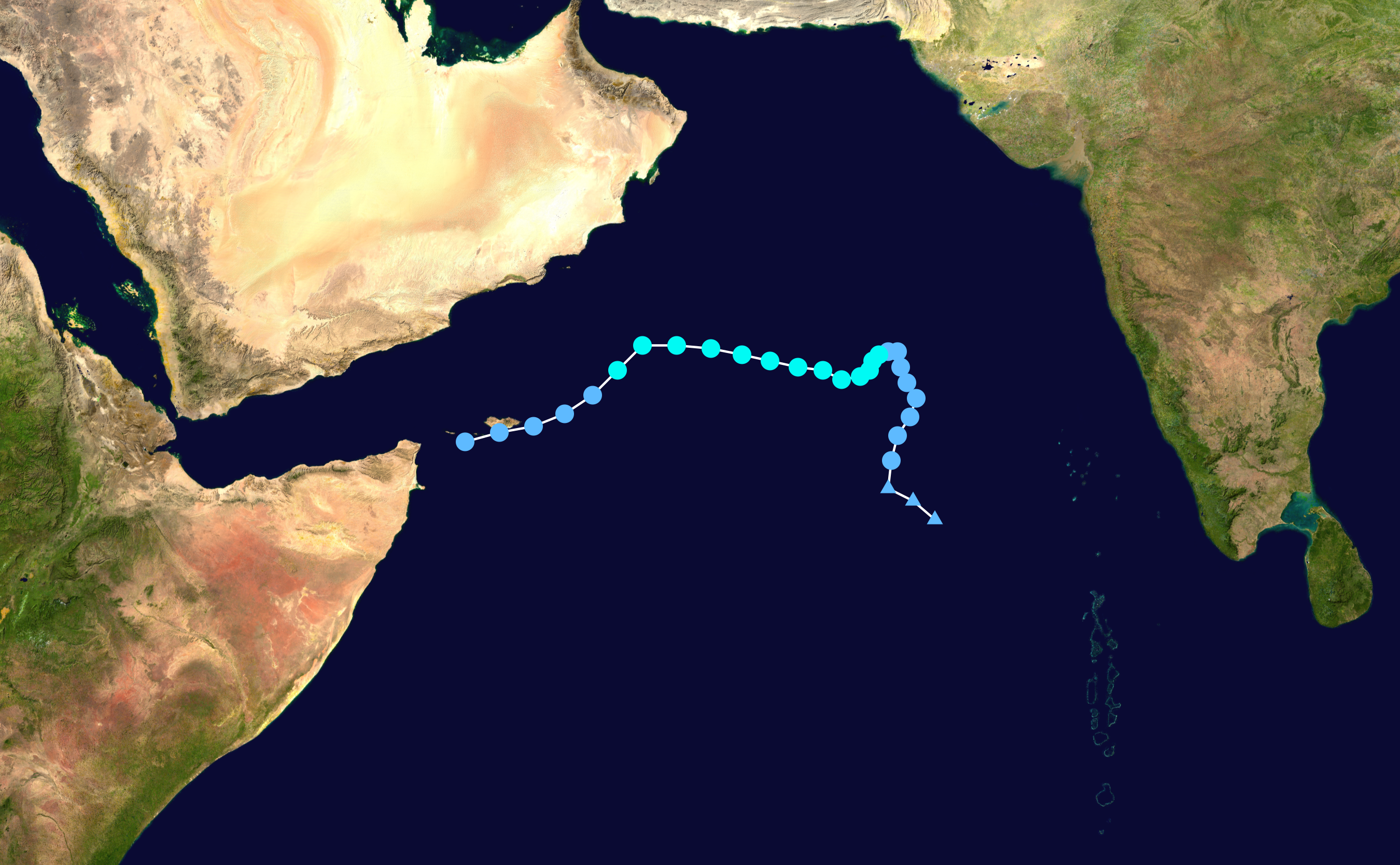
- Duration: November 2 – November 7
- Peak intensity: 55 km/h (35 mph) (3-min); 1004 hPa (mbar)

An area of convection formed west of Sri Lanka on October 31, organizing around a circulation center. Low wind shear allowed slow development, and a low-pressure area developed on November 1 in the southeastern Arabian Sea. The following day, a depression formed off the southwest coast of India. Moving northward, the system's convection continued to organize around the center, and the JTWC classified it as Tropical Cyclone 04A on November 4. The IMD upgraded it to a deep depression on the next day as the storm began moving westward. Despite good outflow, the convection failed to intensify further and was limited to the eastern portion, and the JTWC did not estimate 1 minute winds higher than 75 km/h (45 mph). The IMD only assessed a peak of 55 km/h (35 mph). Drier air from the north caused the thunderstorms to weaken and expose the circulation. The IMD downgraded the system to a remnant low on November 7, and the remnants continued to the west-southwest, passing near Socotra Island. On November 9, the remnant circulation brushed the coast of Somalia after redeveloping some convection, but there was no redevelopment.

=== Severe Cyclonic Storm Agni ===
- Severe cyclonic storm (IMD)
- Category 1 tropical cyclone (SSHWS)
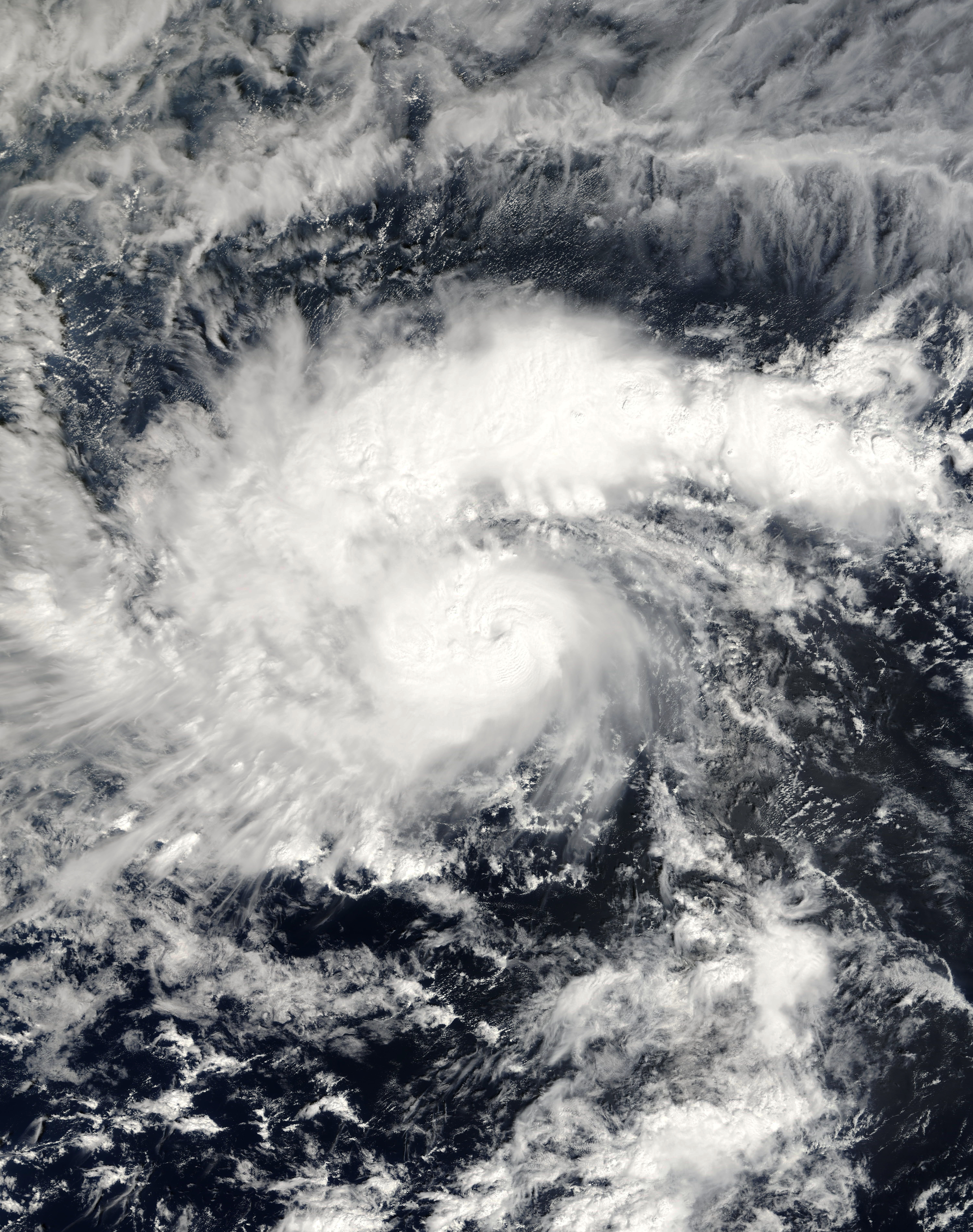
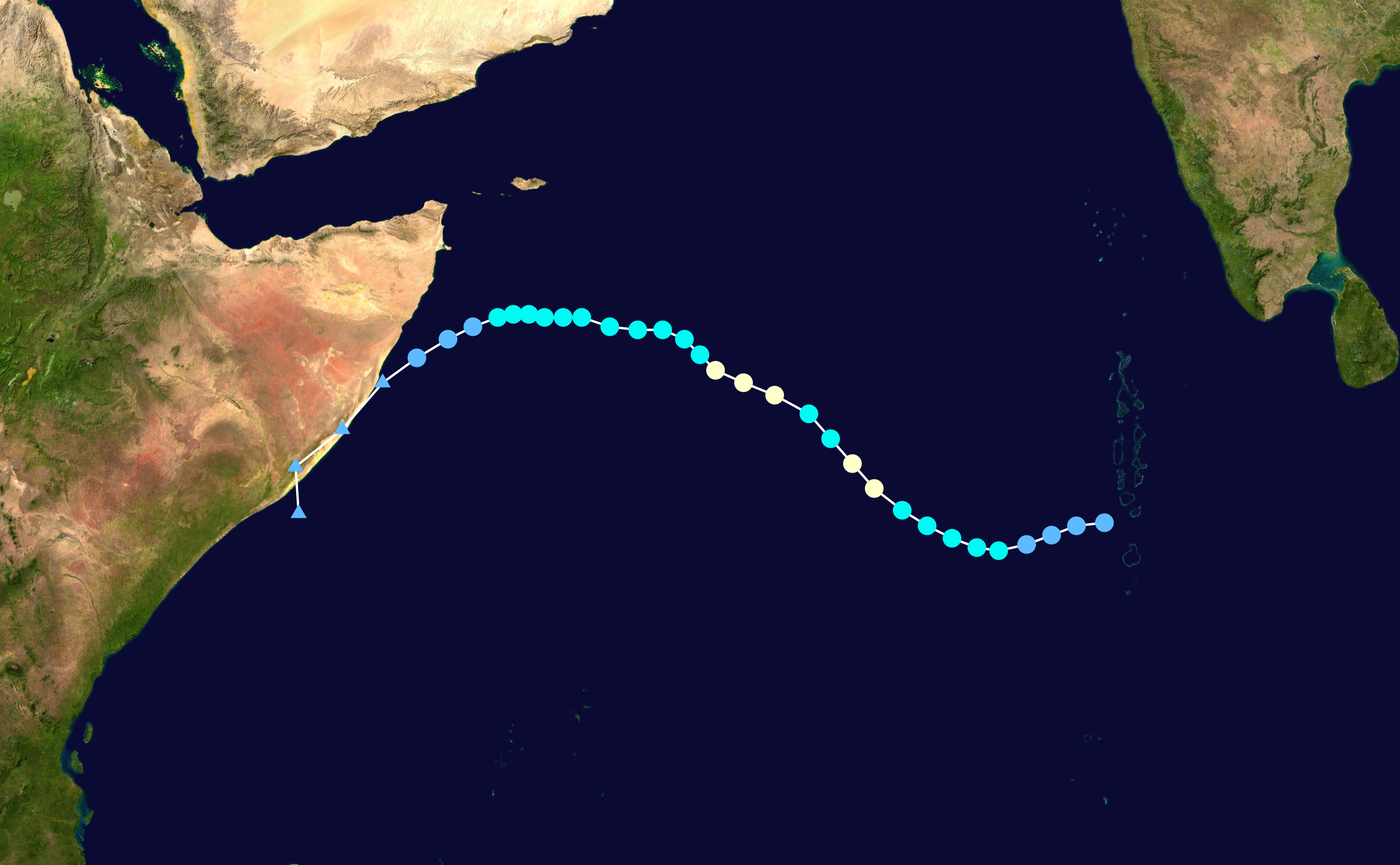
- Duration: November 29 – December 2
- Peak intensity: 100 km/h (65 mph) (3-min); 994 hPa (mbar)

A tropical disturbance was observed on November 19 about 800 km (500 mi) southeast of Colombo, Sri Lanka in the Bay of Bengal. The disturbance tracked westward, gradually organizing and prompting the JTWC to issue a Tropical Cyclone Formation Alert (TCFA) on November 22. After passing south of Sri Lanka, it became disorganized and was no longer considered likely to develop into a tropical cyclone. The circulation associated with the system continued westward, reorganizing on November 26 in the Arabian Sea. Despite being located unusually close to the equator, the disturbance maintained convection, or thunderstorms, which was becoming organized around the weak low-level circulation. With low wind shear and diffluence aloft, the JTWC remarked the system had a fair chance of developing. While the system was organizing, the center crossed the equator to reach about 0.5° S, thus becoming an anticyclonic circulation in the southern hemisphere. This was unusual, as the Coriolis effect is nonexistent along the equator—the Coriolis effect refers to planetary vorticity, which provides the spin in a cyclone. The JTWC later assessed the system as remaining in the northern hemisphere, reaching as far south as 0.7° N, or about 80 km (50 mi) from the equator. After the circulation organized further beneath the convection, the JTWC issued another TCFA at 0300 UTC on November 28. Three hours later, the agency classified the system as Tropical Cyclone 05A about 1300 km (800 mi) southwest of the southern tip of India. In a post-season analysis, the JTWC estimated the cyclone became a tropical storm six hours earlier. At around the same time, the IMD classified it as a "low-pressure area... likely to become well marked." Upon being classified, the tropical cyclone was moving northwestward under the influence of a ridge over India. Its outflow to the north and south became better defined, although its proximity to the equator limited its southerly outflow somewhat due to wind shear.

Early on November 29, the IMD classified the system as a depression, and throughout the day it rapidly intensified to become a cyclonic storm; a cyclonic storm is a tropical cyclone with at least 65 km/h (40 mph) winds sustained for 3 minutes. Around that time, the JTWC assessed the cyclone as reaching peak winds of 120 km/h (75 mph), sustained for 1 minute, along with gusts to 150 km/h (95 mph). Late on November 29, the cyclone weakened slightly, only to regain its peak intensity by November 30; at that time, it developed a banding eye, and was located about 1500 km (900 mi) southeast of the coast of Somalia. At 1200 UTC on November 30, the IMD issued its first complete advisory on the cyclone, naming it Severe Cyclonic Storm Agni and estimating peak winds at 100 km/h (60 mph); the agency predicted the storm would continue northwestward and strengthen slightly before weakening. At its peak, the cyclone had a barometric pressure of 985 mbar. After reaching peak intensity, an increase in wind shear caused the eye to disappear, and the convection decreased significantly. On December 1, the IMD estimated Agni weakened to cyclonic storm status, around which time the center became exposed from the convection. The cyclone continued its steady weakening continued due to the wind shear, the presence of dry air, and cooler water temperatures, and by December 2, the IMD downgraded Agni to depression status, which was its final warning on the system. As it approached the coast of Somalia, it turned westward due to the building of a ridge over Saudi Arabia. Despite unfavorable conditions, thunderstorms briefly reformed over the circulation, which allowed the storm to maintain its intensity. By late on December 3, Agni weakened to below tropical storm status, and the JTWC issued its final warning while the storm was about 450 km (275 mi) south-southeast of Cape Guardafui—the easternmost point of the Horn of Africa. The circulation became difficult to locate by early on December 4, by which time the system had little remaining convection. It turned southwestward and later to the south, moving ashore on eastern Somalia before dissipating on December 5 near Ceel Huur over water.

== Season effects ==
Name	Dates	Peak intensity			Areas affected	Damage (USD)	Deaths	Ref(s).
Name	Dates	Category	Wind speed	Pressure	Areas affected	Damage (USD)	Deaths	Ref(s).
ARB 01	May 5–10	Severe Cyclonic Storm	100 km/h (60 mph)	984 hPa (29.06 inHg)	Kerala, Karnataka, Goa	$6.7 million	9	
BOB 01	May 16 –19	Extremely Severe Cyclonic Storm	165 km/h (105 mph)	952 hPa (28.11 inHg)	Myanmar, East India, Bangladesh	$99.2 million	236	
ARB 02	June 10 –13	Deep Depression	55 km/h (35 mph)	992 hPa (29.29 inHg)	West India	None	Unknown	
BOB 02	June 11 –14	Deep Depression	55 km/h (35 mph)	992 hPa (29.29 inHg)	East India	Unknown	Unknown	
LAND	September 12 –15	Depression	45 km/h (30 mph)	996 hPa (29.41 inHg)	East India	Unknown	59	
Onil	September 30 –October 3	Severe Cyclonic Storm	100 km/h (60 mph)	990 hPa (29.23 inHg)	West India, Pakistan	Unknown	9	
BOB 03/04	October 2 –8	Depression	45 km/h (30 mph)	1002 hPa (29.59 inHg)	East India	$23.9 million	273	
ARB 04	November 2 –7	Deep Depression	55 km/h (35 mph)	1004 hPa (29.65 inHg)	Somalia	Unknown	None	
Agni	November 29 –December 2	Severe Cyclonic Storm	100 km/h (60 mph)	994 hPa (29.35 inHg)	Somalia, Maldives	Unknown	Unknown	
Season aggregates
9 systems	May 5 – December 2		165 km/h (105 mph)	952 hPa (28.11 inHg)		$129.8 million	587	

== See also ==
- North Indian Ocean tropical cyclone
- Tropical cyclones in 2004
- List of wettest tropical cyclones
- List of wettest known tropical cyclones in Pakistan
- 2004 Atlantic hurricane season
- 2004 Pacific hurricane season
- 2004 Pacific typhoon season
- South-West Indian Ocean cyclone seasons: 2003–04, 2004–05
- Australian region cyclone seasons: 2003–04, 2004–05
- South Pacific cyclone seasons: 2003–04, 2004–05
