= Cyclone Onil =

North Indian Ocean severe cyclonic storm in 2004

Severe Cyclonic Storm Onil
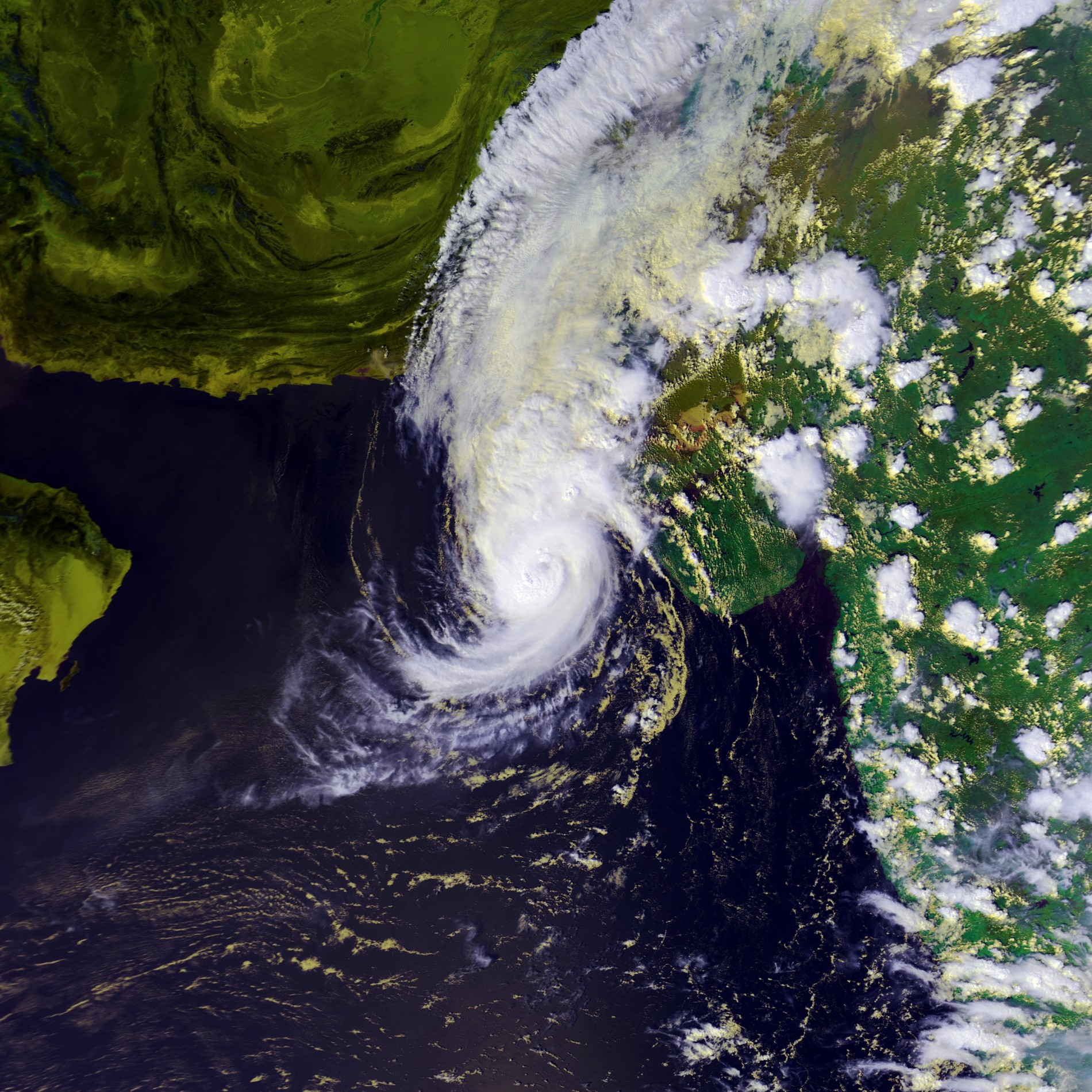
- Cyclone Onil off the coast of Pakistan on October 2

Meteorological history
- Formed: 30 September 2004
- Remnant low: 10 October 2004
- Dissipated: 3 October 2004

Severe cyclonic storm
- 3-minute sustained (IMD)
- Highest winds: 100 km/h (65 mph)
- Lowest pressure: 990 hPa (mbar); 29.23 inHg

Tropical storm
- 1-minute sustained (SSHWS/JTWC)
- Highest winds: 65 km/h (40 mph)

Overall effects
- Fatalities: 9 total
- Damage: None
- Areas affected: India and Pakistan
- IBTrACS
- Part of the 2004 North Indian Ocean cyclone season

Severe Cyclonic Storm Onil (Note: The name Onil (Bengali: অনিল; [ˈo.nil]) was contributed by Bangladesh and means "air, wind" in Bengali.) was the first tropical cyclone to be named in the northern Indian Ocean. Forming out of an area of convection several hundred kilometres southwest of India on 1 October 2004, Cyclone Onil quickly attained its peak intensity on 2 October with winds of 100 km/h (60 mph) and a barometric pressure of 990 mbar (hPa; 29.23 inHg). However, dry air quickly entered the system, causing it to rapidly weaken to a depression just off the coast of Gujarat, India. Over the following several days, the system took a slow, erratic track towards the south-southeast. After turning northeastward, the system made landfall near Porbandar on 10 October and dissipated shortly thereafter.

Throughout southeastern Pakistan and northwestern India, thousands of residents were evacuated prior to the cyclone's arrival. In these areas, the storm produced moderate to heavy rainfall, peaking at 145 mm (5.7 in) in Thatta, Sindh, Pakistan. These rains led to flash flooding in several areas. Nine people died in several incidents related to the storm in Karachi. The drainage system of Hyderabad sustained significant damage, leading to several protests and demonstrations by city residents. Offshore, 300 fishermen are believed to have gone missing during the storm; no reports have confirmed their whereabouts since they disappeared.

== Meteorological history ==
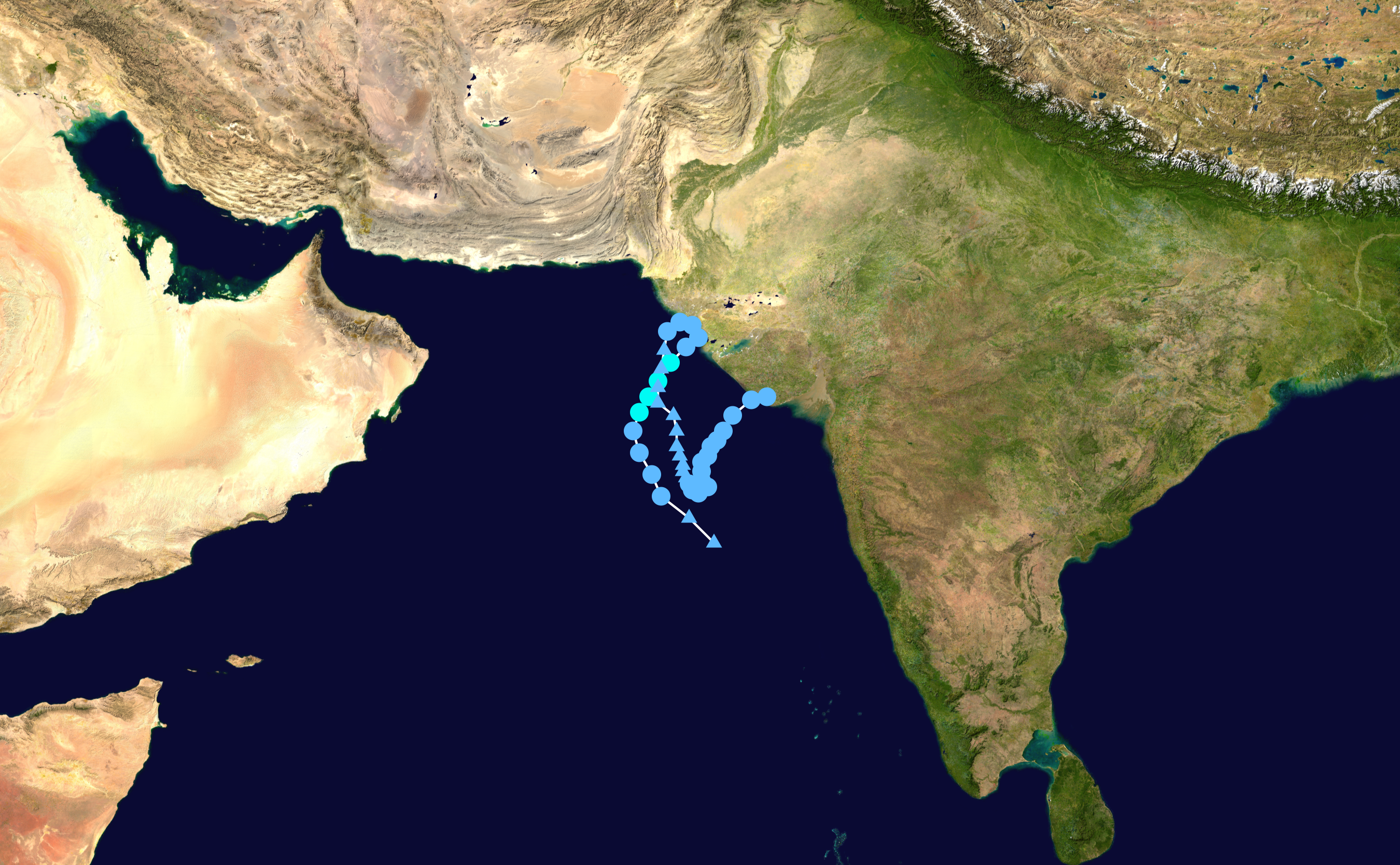
Map plotting the storm's track and intensity, according to the Saffir–Simpson scale Map key Saffir–Simpson scale Tropical depression (≤38 mph, ≤62 km/h) Tropical storm (39–73 mph, 63–118 km/h) Category 1 (74–95 mph, 119–153 km/h) Category 2 (96–110 mph, 154–177 km/h) Category 3 (111–129 mph, 178–208 km/h) Category 4 (130–156 mph, 209–251 km/h) Category 5 (≥157 mph, ≥252 km/h) Unknown Storm type Tropical cyclone Subtropical cyclone Extratropical cyclone, remnant low, tropical disturbance, or monsoon depression

Severe Cyclonic Storm Onil was first identified as an area of convection early on 30 September 2004 situated roughly 465 km (290 mi) southwest of Mumbai, India. Satellite imagery depicted a poorly organized system with deep convection partially surrounding a low-level circulation. Situated over warm water and within an area of moderate wind shear, the Joint Typhoon Warning Center (JTWC) assessed the system's chances of developing into a tropical cyclone as "fair". Within several hours of being identified, the India Meteorological Department (IMD) began monitoring the system as Depression ARB 03. Despite a decrease in convection later on 30 September, the IMD upgraded the cyclone to a deep depression, stating that three-minute sustained winds had reached 55 km/h (35 mph). Early the next day, organization substantially improved, prompting the JTWC to issue a Tropical Cyclone Formation Alert. Around 0900 UTC on 1 October, the IMD upgraded the deep depression to Cyclonic Storm Onil. Upon being named, the storm became the first tropical cyclone on record to be named in the northern Indian Ocean. The WMO/ESCAP Panel agreed in May 2004 that in September, tropical cyclones in the Northern Indian Ocean attaining gale-force winds would be given names.

Later on 1 October, the JTWC issued their first advisory on the storm, classifying it as Tropical Cyclone 03A. Tracking towards the northeast, Onil intensified as convection consolidated around the center of circulation. Roughly 24 hours after being named, the system attained its peak intensity as a severe cyclonic storm with winds of 100 km/h (60 mph) and a barometric pressure of 990 mbar (hPa; 29.23 inHg) according to the IMD with. Upon reaching this strength, the system featured a pinhole eye surrounded by deep convection. Additionally, Dvorak technique intensity estimates reached 3.5, indicating a high-end tropical storm. However, the JTWC stated maximum winds to be 65 km/h (40 mph), a low-end tropical storm. As the storm neared the Indian coastline, dry air quickly entered the circulation, causing most of the convection associated with Onil to dissipate. Located within 100 km (65 mi) of land, the JTWC downgraded the system to a tropical depression and the IMD downgraded Onil to a deep depression.

On 3 October, the center of Onil skimmed the coastline of northwestern India; however, the center did not cross land. Around this time, the upper-level circulation detached from the low-level circulation, further weakening the storm. Early on 4 October, the JTWC stated that the system had degenerated into a non-convective remnant low-pressure system. After executing a counter-clockwise loop, the depression slowly tracked south-southeastward, away from land. By 7 October, the system was reclassified as a tropical depression by the JTWC as it stalled several hundred kilometres southwest of Gujarat, India. The system maintained a relatively low intensity for the following several days before making landfall near Porbandar with winds of 45 km/h (30 mph). Within hours of moving inland, Onil dissipated early on 10 October.

== Impact and aftermath ==
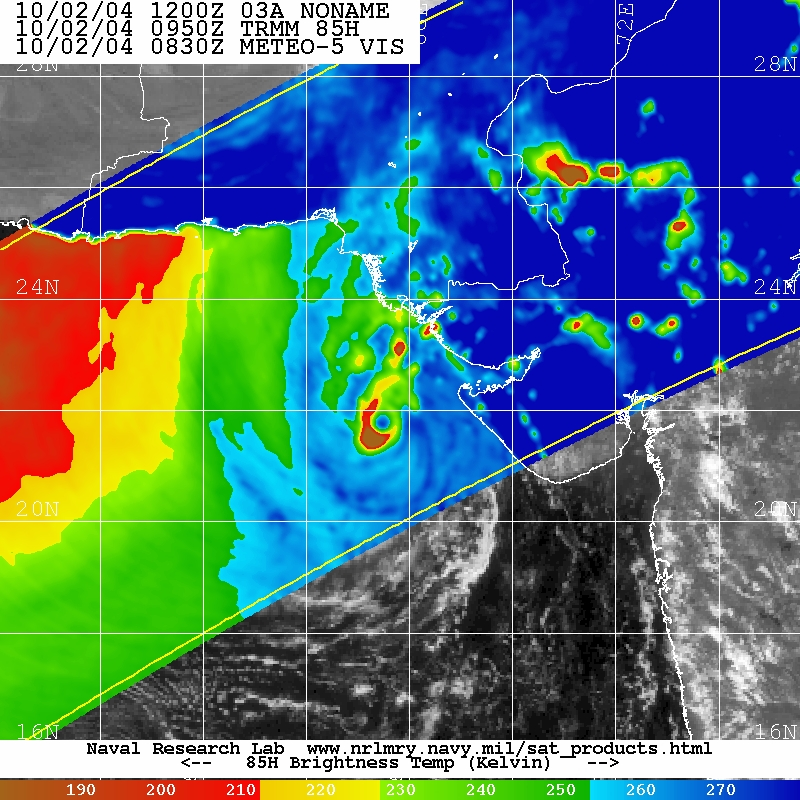
Microwave satellite image of Cyclone Onil on 2 October depicting the pinhole eye

In northwestern India, thousands of residents were evacuated in fears of Onil striking the region. According to one of the evacuated residents, this was the seventh evacuation due to a cyclone in the area since 1999. On 10 October, the storm's remnants brought light to moderate rainfall in India; there was no known rainfall amount exceeding 100 mm (3.9 in) throughout the region.

In southeastern Pakistan, an estimated 6,000 people were evacuated from coastal regions prior to Cyclone Onil's arrival. Port officials warned fishermen not to venture out during the storm due to rough seas. Cyclone Onil brought moderate to heavy rainfall and gusty winds. A maximum of 145 mm (5.7 in) of rain fell in Thatta, Sindh between 2 and 3 October. In Hyderabad, heavy rains amounting to 98 mm (3.9 in) caused a 10 ft (3.0 m) section of a drainage system to collapse, prompting the evacuation of several hundred residents. Throughout Sindh, an estimated 607 square kilometres (234 sq mi) of land was inundated by flood waters, destroying roughly 70% of the cotton crop. In the city of Karachi, nine people were killed in various incidents related to the storm at least 35 mph (56 km/h) winds were reported. Two people were killed after being electrocuted by a downed power line outside their home. Many streets in the city were flooded and power lines were downed. Another one of these people died while trying to clear a drain near her house when a wall collapsed on her. Offshore, 163 fishermen were reported to be missing after being caught in the storm. However, reports from Pakistani officials stated that at least 300 fishermen were missing. In other areas, power was lost for more than 48 hours after Onil moved through the region. Around Karo Gongro, 100 people were stranded along a major roadway after flash flooding struck the area.

In the wake of the storm, Pakistani officials set up 26 relief camps where residents were offered food and shelter. Roughly 3,000 people sought refuge in these shelters. Mobile units were also set up by the District Health Department to minimize the impacts of any post-storm diseases. On 3 October, Imtiaz Ahmed Shaikh expressed his grief over the damage caused by Cyclonic Storm Onil and stated that he would be touring the affected region within the following days. At least 40 million Pakistani rupee ($469,000 USD) was allocated in relief funds by Sindh Minister Syed Papoo Shah. On 4 October, port officials stated that it was safe for fishermen to resume their activities in the Arabian Sea. Later that day, a rain emergency was declared for Hyderabad and emergency shelters were set up in the city. All officers in the Hyderabad Development Authority who were initially put on leave ahead of the cyclone were told to resume work to assist in clearing drainage systems. Several days after the storm, reports indicated that there were more than 300 instances where the city's drainage system collapsed across the area, resulting in standing water in many structures. Residents in these areas, frustrated by the lack of quick action by the government, began holding protests about the flooding. In response to these protests, Shaukat Hayat Bhutto suspended Assistant Engineer Sewage manager, Qamar Memon, for his negligence on draining flood waters.

== See also ==
- 2004 North Indian Ocean cyclone season
- List of wettest known tropical cyclones in Pakistan
- List of Gujarat tropical cyclones
