= Tropical Storm Matmo and Cyclone Bulbul =

Pacific severe tropical storm and North Indian cyclone in 2019

Severe Tropical Storm Matmo Very Severe Cyclonic Storm Bulbul
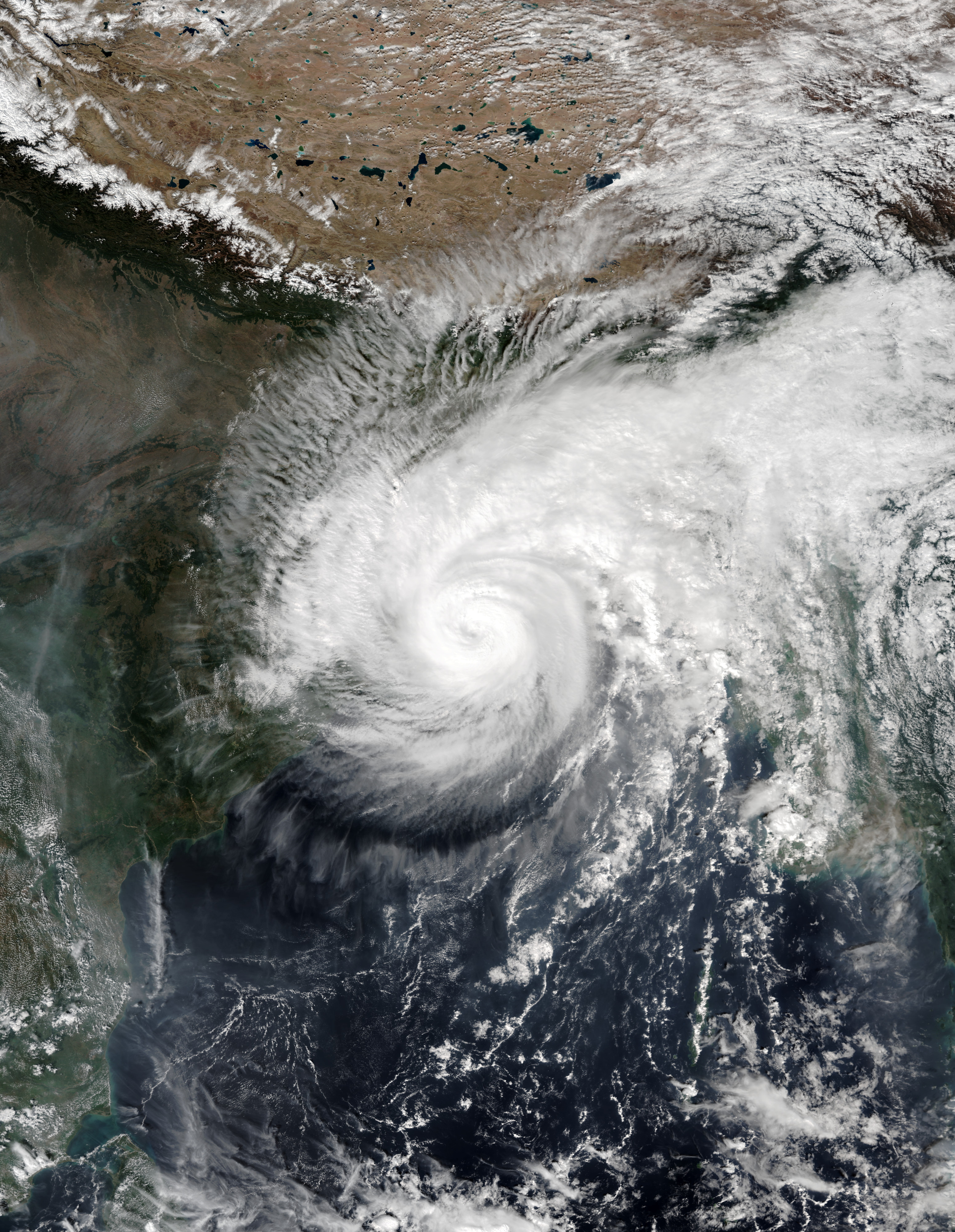
- Cyclone Bulbul near peak intensity, just before landfall in West Bengal on November 9

Meteorological history
- as Severe Tropical Storm Matmo
- Formed: October 28, 2019
- Dissipated: October 31, 2019

Severe tropical storm
- 10-minute sustained (JMA)
- Highest winds: 95 km/h (60 mph)
- Lowest pressure: 992 hPa (mbar); 29.29 inHg

Tropical storm
- 1-minute sustained (SSHWS/JTWC)
- Highest winds: 100 km/h (65 mph)
- Lowest pressure: 990 hPa (mbar); 29.23 inHg

Meteorological history
- as Very Severe Cyclonic Storm Bulbul
- Formed: November 5, 2019
- Dissipated: November 11, 2019

Very severe cyclonic storm
- 3-minute sustained (IMD)
- Highest winds: 140 km/h (85 mph)
- Lowest pressure: 976 hPa (mbar); 28.82 inHg

Category 3-equivalent tropical cyclone
- 1-minute sustained (SSHWS/JTWC)
- Highest winds: 195 km/h (120 mph)
- Lowest pressure: 955 hPa (mbar); 28.20 inHg

Overall effects
- Fatalities: 43 total
- Damage: $3.41 billion (2019 USD)
- Areas affected: Vietnam, Laos, Cambodia, Thailand, Myanmar, Andaman and Nicobar Islands, Eastern India, Bangladesh
- Part of the 2019 Pacific typhoon and North Indian Ocean cyclone seasons

Severe Tropical Storm Matmo (Note: The name Matmo (Chamorro: måtmo, [mɑtmo]) was contributed by the United States and means "heavy rain" in Chamorro.) and Very Severe Cyclonic Storm Bulbul (Note: The name Bulbul (Urdu: بلبل, [bʊlbʊl]) was contributed by Pakistan and refers to the bulbul or the common nightingale (Luscinia megarhynchos) in Urdu.) (JTWC designation: 23W) were a pair of destructive tropical cyclones that tracked in the Western Pacific Ocean and the North Indian Ocean in October and November 2019 respectively, killing 43 people and inflicting about US$3.537 billion in damage. Matmo was the 41st tropical depression and the 22nd named storm of the 2019 Pacific typhoon season, while Bulbul was the 9th depression and the 7th named storm of the 2019 North Indian Ocean cyclone season. The cyclone formed on October 28 in the South China Sea and intensified into Tropical Storm Matmo, as named by the Japan Meteorological Agency (JMA). On October 30, the storm made landfall in central Vietnam, causing flooding. Matmo weakened while moving westward across Mainland Southeast Asia, before degenerating into a remnant low later that day. The remnants of Matmo emerged into the Bay of Bengal, redeveloping into a depression on November 5. Late the next day, it strengthened into a cyclonic storm, renamed Bulbul by the India Meteorological Department (IMD), although the JTWC continued to refer to it as Matmo. The storm peaked on November 8, with maximum sustained winds of 140 km/h (85 mph) estimated by the IMD. On November 9, the cyclone made its final landfall in the eastern Indian state of West Bengal, with the storm then turning to the northeast, and moving into Bangladesh. The system degenerated into a remnant low two days later, over northeastern India.

In India and Bangladesh, the storm caused storm surge, heavy rains, and flash floods. In addition, it is only the second storm to reach hurricane-equivalent strength in the Bay of Bengal after moving over Mainland Southeast Asia, the first being another cyclone in October 1960.

== Meteorological history ==
Map plotting the storm's track and intensity, according to the Saffir–Simpson scale Map key Saffir–Simpson scale Tropical depression (≤38 mph, ≤62 km/h) Tropical storm (39–73 mph, 63–118 km/h) Category 1 (74–95 mph, 119–153 km/h) Category 2 (96–110 mph, 154–177 km/h) Category 3 (111–129 mph, 178–208 km/h) Category 4 (130–156 mph, 209–251 km/h) Category 5 (≥157 mph, ≥252 km/h) Unknown Storm type Tropical cyclone Subtropical cyclone Extratropical cyclone, remnant low, tropical disturbance, or monsoon depression

On October 28, a tropical depression formed near Palawan, which was named Matmo by the Japan Meteorological Agency (JMA) on October 30. It quickly intensified into a severe tropical storm, packing 10-minute sustained winds up to 60 mph (95 km/h), as it approached the Vietnamese coast. A quick moving storm, Matmo made landfall in Vietnam on the same day, bringing strong winds and heavy rain, causing moderate flooding and many road closures in the country. Not long after landfall in Vietnam, it weakened into a tropical depression, later degenerating into a remnant low as its low-level circulation dissipated.

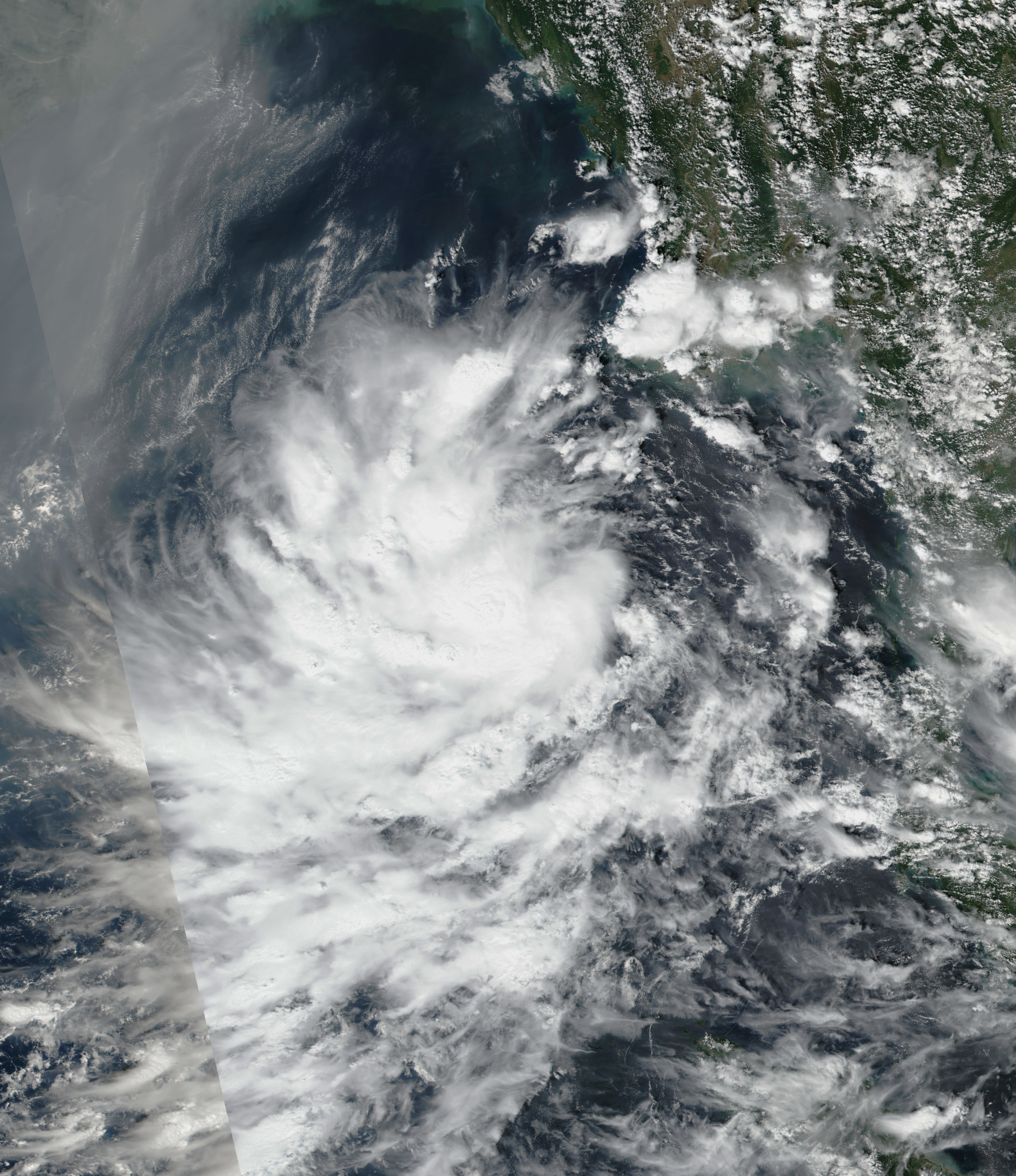
Severe Tropical Storm Matmo's remnant re-organizing over the Andaman Sea on November 4, 2019.

On November 2, the remnants of Matmo emerged into the northern Andaman Sea. Meteorological agencies began to show interest in the system, as it slowly began to reorganize and develop, with the storm developing a new low-level circulation on November 4. It then fully reformed into a depression on November 5. Upon strengthening into a cyclonic storm, the India Meteorological Department (IMD) assigned the name Bulbul. It continued intensifying and strengthening for the next three days; however, the storm still slowly moving northward, prompting the IMD to issue coastal warnings for Bangladesh and West Bengal of India, in addition to prohibiting all fishermen activity, beach activity, and boating in and around the Bay of Bengal. About a day later, Bulbul made landfall near Sagar Island in West Bengal, around 18:30 GMT on November 9, killing at least two people and weakening back to a Severe Cyclonic Storm, as it interacted with land and unleashed a high storm surge. Not too long after this land interaction, Bulbul rapidly weakened into a deep depression on the next day, as it began to move over Bangladesh; however, the storm still continued to cause very heavy rain, before weakening into a well-marked low on November 11.

== Preparations ==
=== Bangladesh ===
Ahead of Bulbul's landfall, Bangladeshi officials ordered 2.1 million people to evacuate coastal areas. Due to the cyclone, all the JSC–JDC examinations on November 9, 11, and 12, and the National University examination on November 9 were suspended. Bangladesh Inland Water Transport Authority suspended all sorts of activities at three maritime ports and riverine transport services during the cyclone. All flights to and from Shah Amanat International Airport in Chittagong and Cox's Bazar, Barisal, Jashore domestic airports were cancelled for 14 hours owing to the inclement weather under the influence of the cyclone. Health department officials in these districts formed 1,599 teams to attend to those affected by the cyclone. Around 56,000 volunteers were deployed to conduct rescue and relief efforts while the military bases at the coastal districts remain on alert. All coastal infantries of the Bangladesh Army prepared to take immediate action to provide assistance during and post cyclonic destruction. The Bangladesh Navy and the Bangladesh Coast Guard prepared to undertake emergency rescue and relief operations with warships and vessels.

== Impact and aftermath ==
=== Vietnam ===
Matmo destroyed 2,700 houses and 35 schools, causing 912 billion VND (US$39.4 million) in damage in Vietnam, with majority of losses in two provinces: Quảng Ngãi and Bình Định. The storm also killed two people in the country.

=== Bangladesh ===
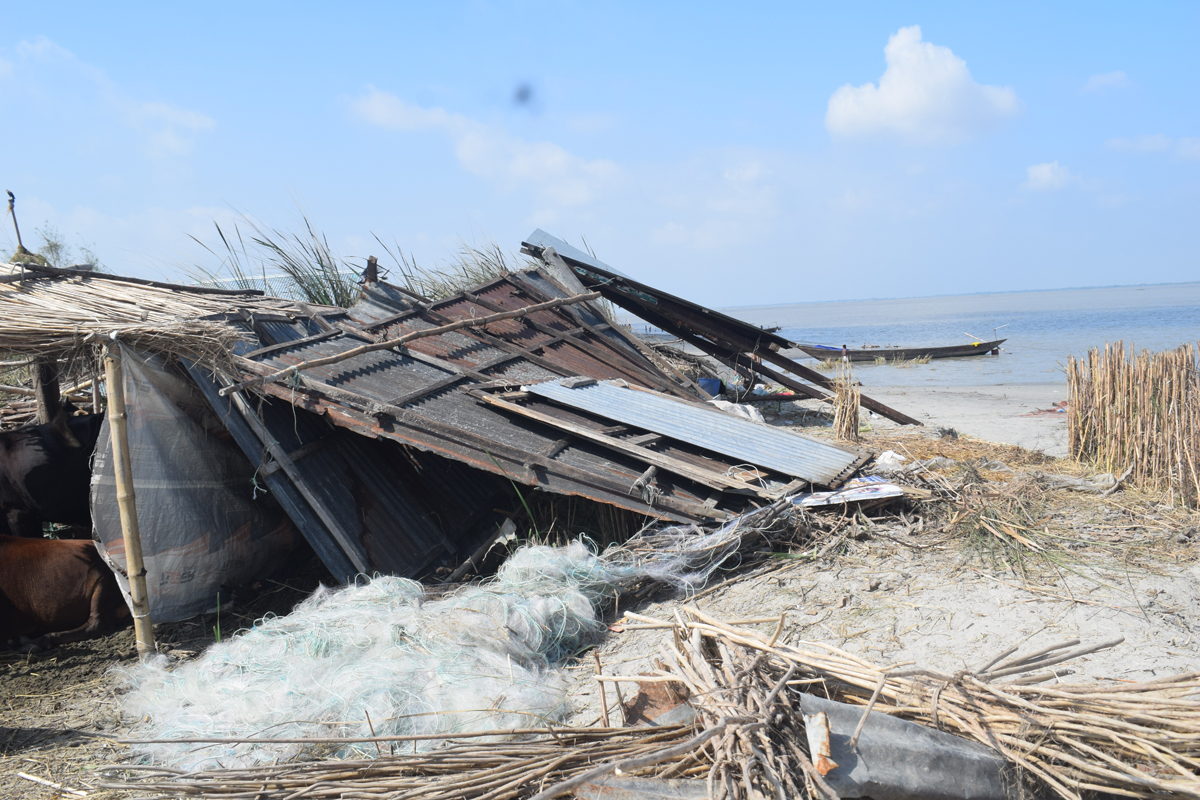
Rajrajeshwar Char of Chandpur, Bangladesh affected by cyclone Bulbul

Cyclone Bulbul caused severe damage across coastal Bangladesh, resulting in the deaths of 25 people. In the Khulna District, 9,455 homes were destroyed and 37,820 were damaged. Across the Bagerhat District, 8,788 homes were destroyed and 35,779 were damaged. The nation's agriculture industry was severely affected, with 289,006 hectares (714,150 acres) of farmland—roughly 14 percent of the nation's total farmland—was damaged. Approximately 72,000 metric tons of crops were lost, with a total value of Tk 2.68 billion (US$31.6 million).

=== India ===
==== Odisha ====
In Odisha, the cyclone's outer bands produced heavy rain and squalls, causing agricultural damage, uprooting trees, and knocking down power lines. Although, as part of rescue, around 350 local villagers in the district of Balesore were taken to cyclone shelters as the storm neared. An estimated 200,000 hectares (490,000 acres) of crops were damaged statewide. Two people died in storm-related incidents.

==== West Bengal ====
Bulbul's landfall in West Bengal around the Sunderban forest brought extremely heavy rain and winds up to 137 km/h (85 mph) across much of the southern portion of the state. A 59-year-old man was killed after being electrocuted by a lamp post, and another was killed due to a collapsed wall. Before the cyclone even made landfall, however, a man was killed after a cedar tree branch fell on top of him. Fallen trees caused road blockages across the city of Kolkata as well, and members of the Kolkata Municipal Corporation (KMC) removed these blockages. Operations at Netaji Subhas Chandra Bose International Airport in Kolkata were suspended for 12 hours.

Throughout West Bengal, approximately 3.5 million people were directly affected by the cyclone; 14 people died in storm-related incidents. A total of 517,535 homes and 1,489,924 hectares (3,681,680 acres) of crops were damaged or destroyed, with losses reaching Rs 238.11 billion (US$3.34 billion).

West Bengal's Public Health Engineering department distributed 435,000 tarpaulins and 620,000 water containers in the affected areas.

Aftermath of Cyclone Bulbul in Bali Island of Indian Sundarbans, West Bengal

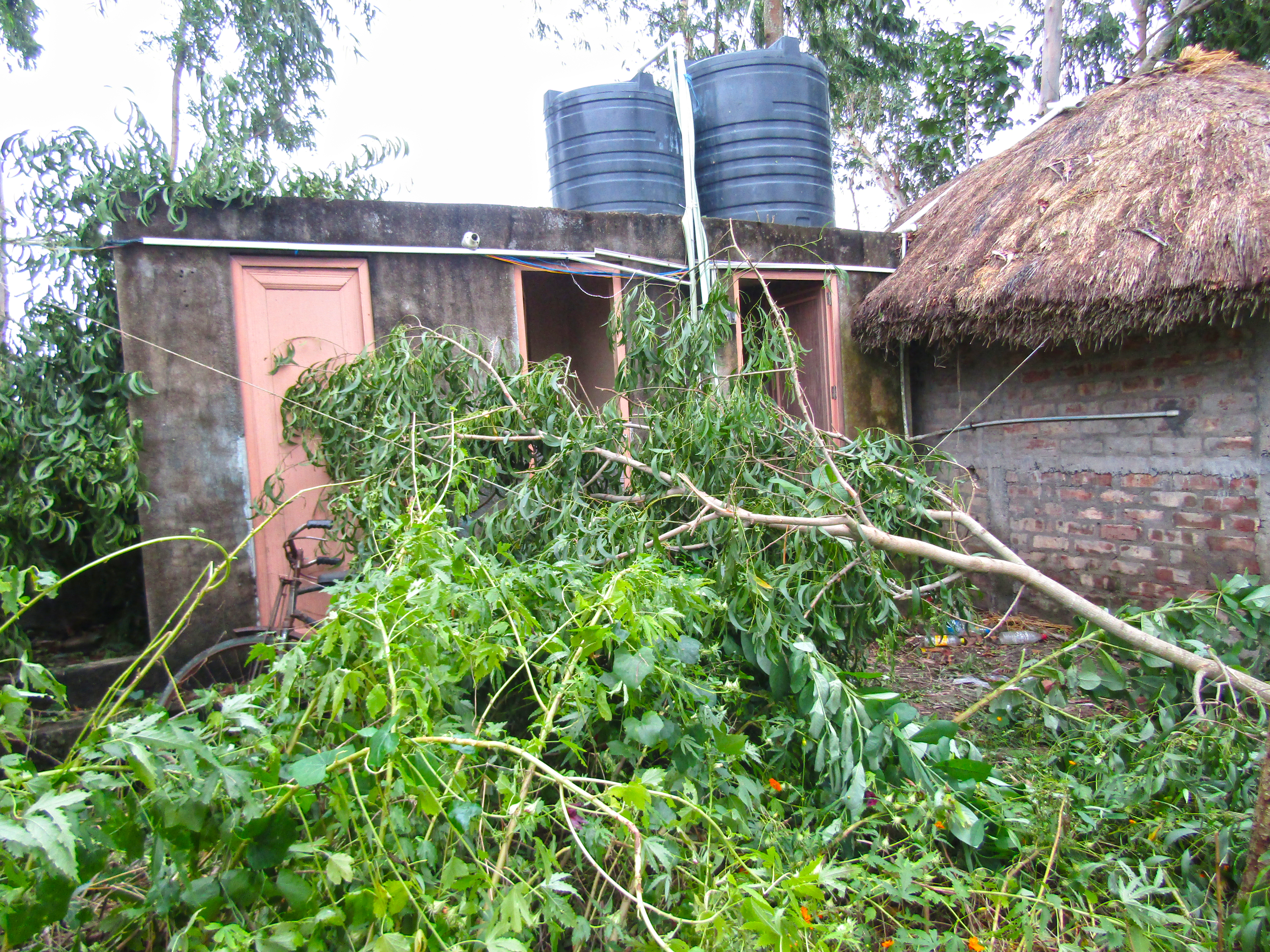

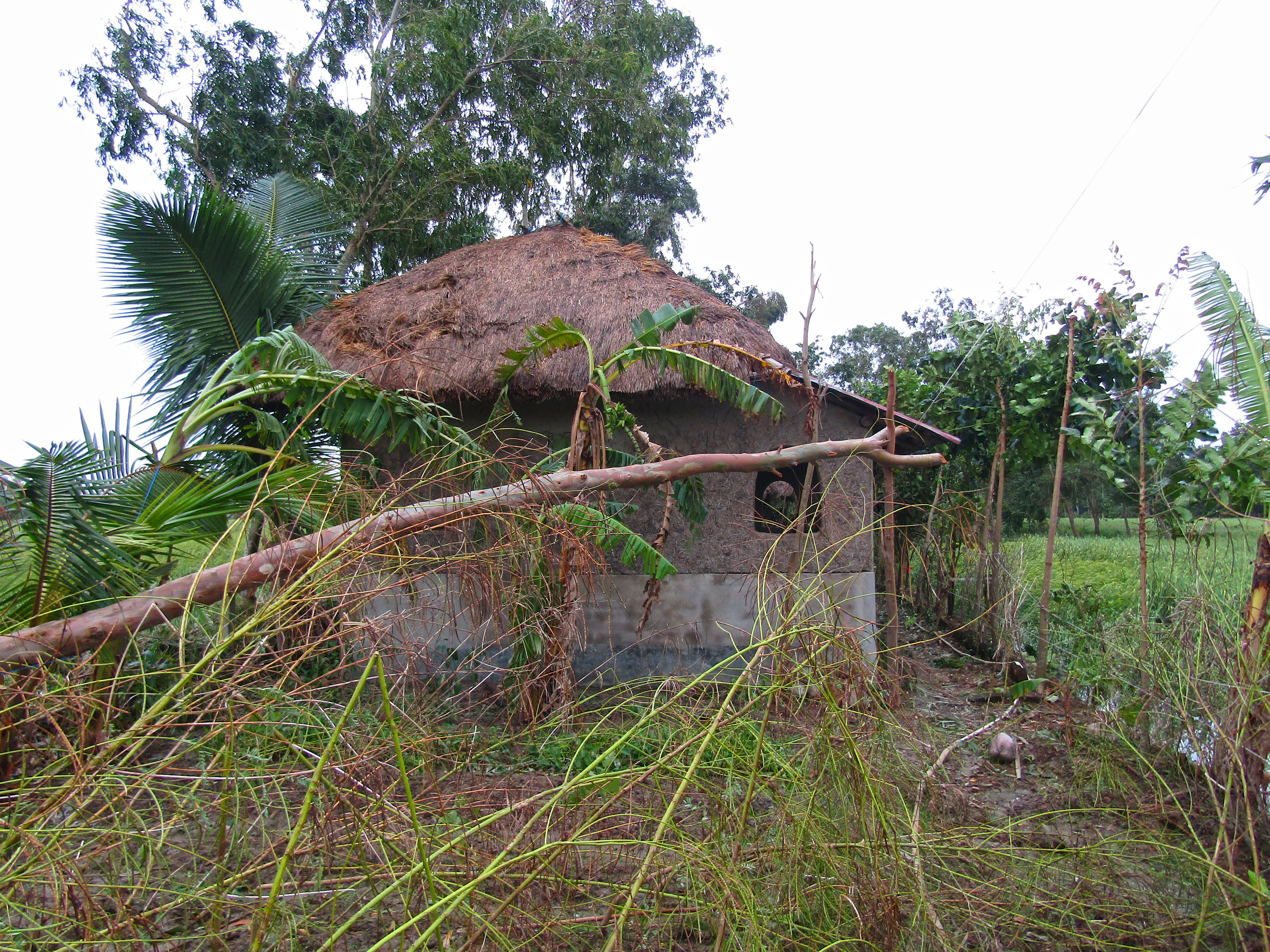

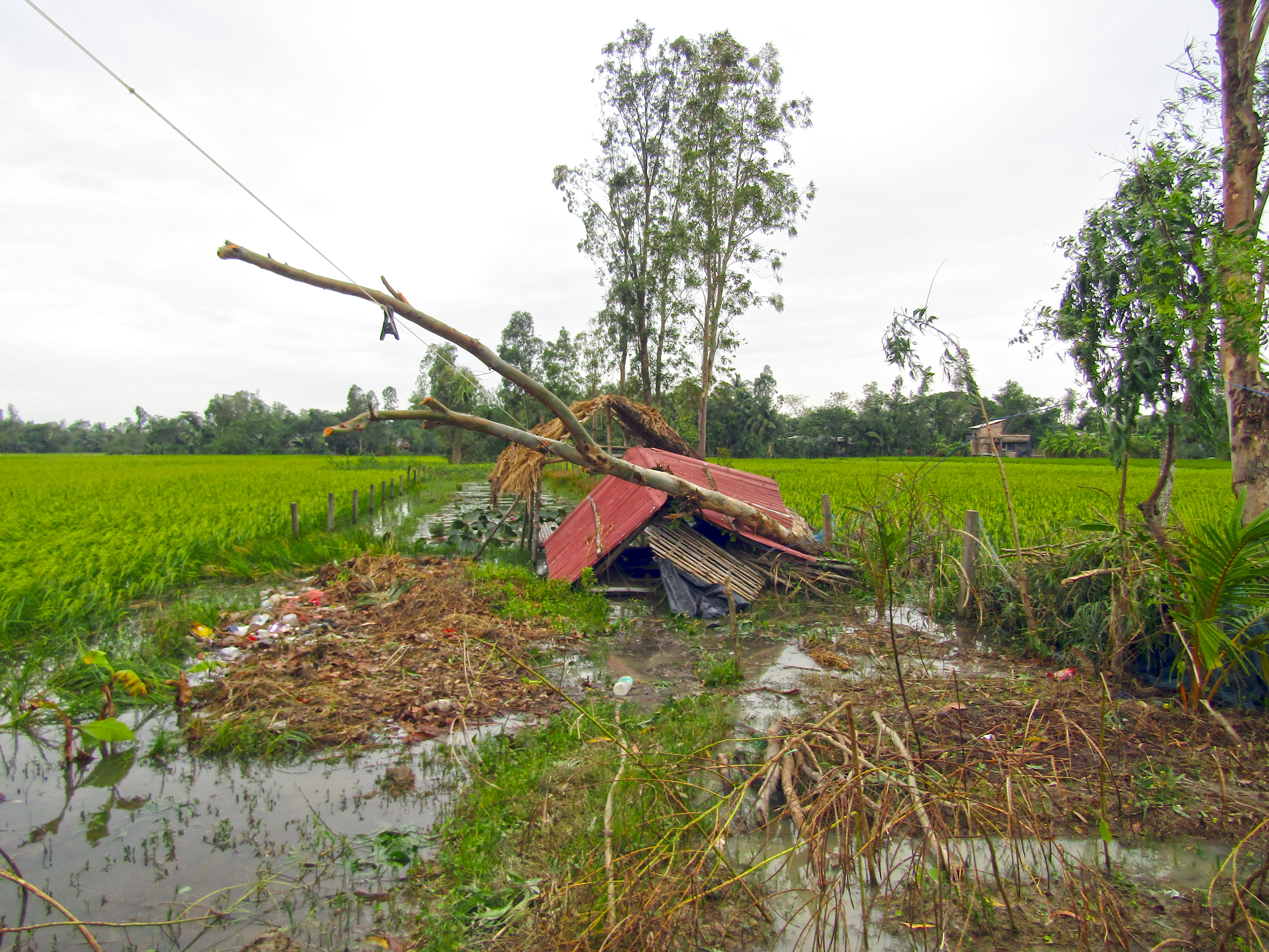

== See also ==
- List of storms named Matmo
- Weather of 2019
- Tropical cyclones in 2019
- List of Bangladesh tropical cyclones
- 1876 Bengal cyclone
- 1970 Bhola cyclone
- Cyclone Sidr (2007)
- Cyclone Nargis (2008)
- Tropical Depressions Wilma and BOB 05 (2013)
- Tropical Storm Pabuk (2019)
- Cyclone Fani (2019)
- Cyclone Amphan (2020)
- Cyclone Mocha (2023)
- Cyclone Senyar (2025)
