= Cyclone Sidr =

North Indian Ocean cyclone in 2007

Extremely Severe Cyclonic Storm Sidr
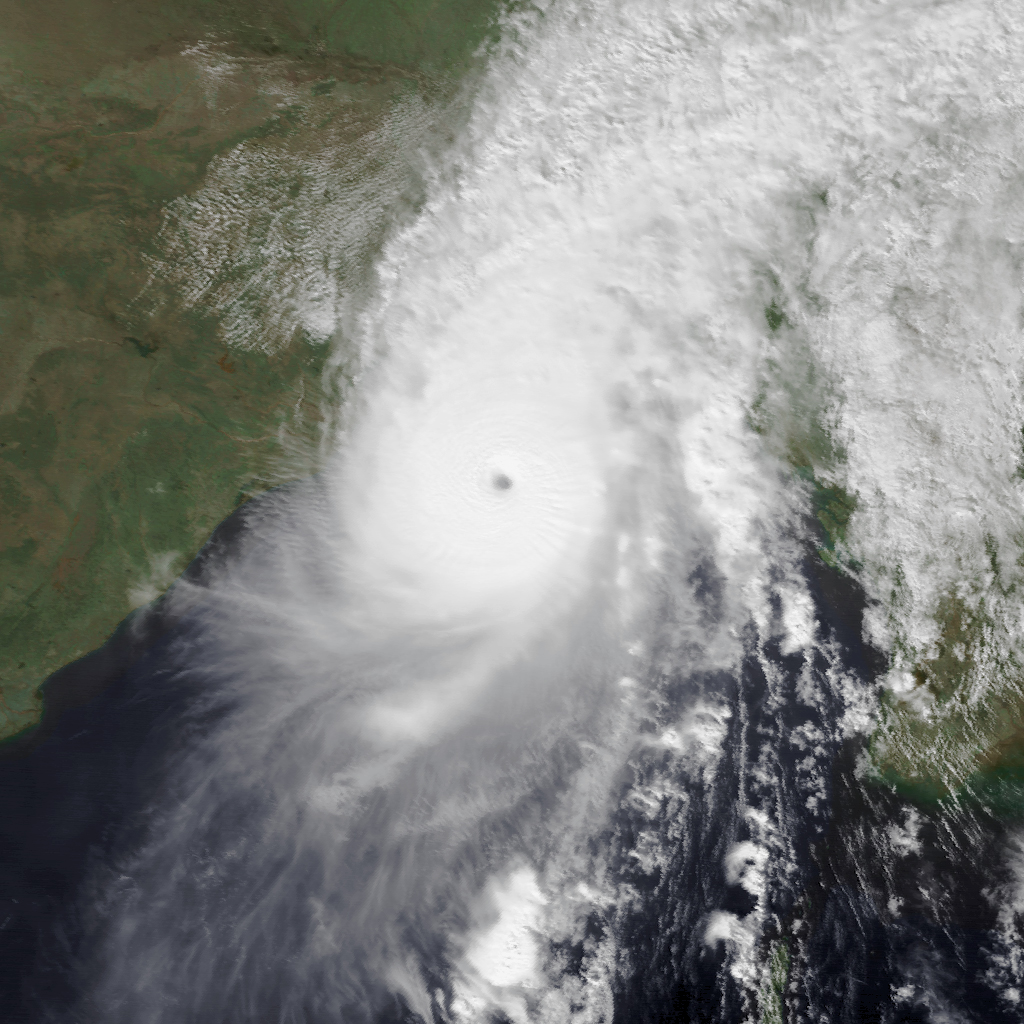
- Sidr at peak intensity in the Bay of Bengal on November 15

Meteorological history
- Formed: November 11, 2007
- Dissipated: November 16, 2007

Extremely severe cyclonic storm
- 3-minute sustained (IMD)
- Highest winds: 215 km/h (130 mph)
- Lowest pressure: 944 hPa (mbar); 27.88 inHg

Category 5-equivalent tropical cyclone
- 1-minute sustained (SSHWS/JTWC)
- Highest winds: 260 km/h (160 mph)
- Lowest pressure: 918 hPa (mbar); 27.11 inHg

Overall effects
- Fatalities: 3,447–15,000 total
- Damage: $2.31 billion (2007 USD)
- Areas affected: Bangladesh; India; Andaman Islands; West Bengal; Northeast India; Southwest China
- IBTrACS
- Part of the 2007 North Indian Ocean cyclone season

Extremely Severe Cyclonic Storm Sidr (Note: The name Sidr (Arabic: سِدْر, [sidr]) was contributed by Oman and means buckthorn (Ziziphus spina-christi) in Arabic.) was an extremely deadly and devastating tropical cyclone that resulted in one of the worst natural disasters in Bangladesh. The fourth named and the deadliest storm of the 2007 North Indian Ocean cyclone season, Sidr formed in the central Bay of Bengal, and quickly strengthened to reach peak 1-minute sustained winds of 260 km/h (160 mph), making it a Category-5 equivalent tropical cyclone on the Saffir–Simpson scale. The storm eventually made landfall in Bangladesh on November 15, 2007, leading to large-scale evacuations. At least 3,447 deaths have been blamed on the storm, with some estimates reaching 15,000.

Save the Children estimated between 3,100 and 10,000 deaths associated with the cyclone, while the Red Crescent Society reported on November 18 that the number of deaths could be up to 15,000. Other aid agencies have also estimated a death toll of up to 15,000. International groups pledged US$95 million in assistance, while damage estimated at 196.25 billion taka (US$2.31 billion).

== Meteorological history ==
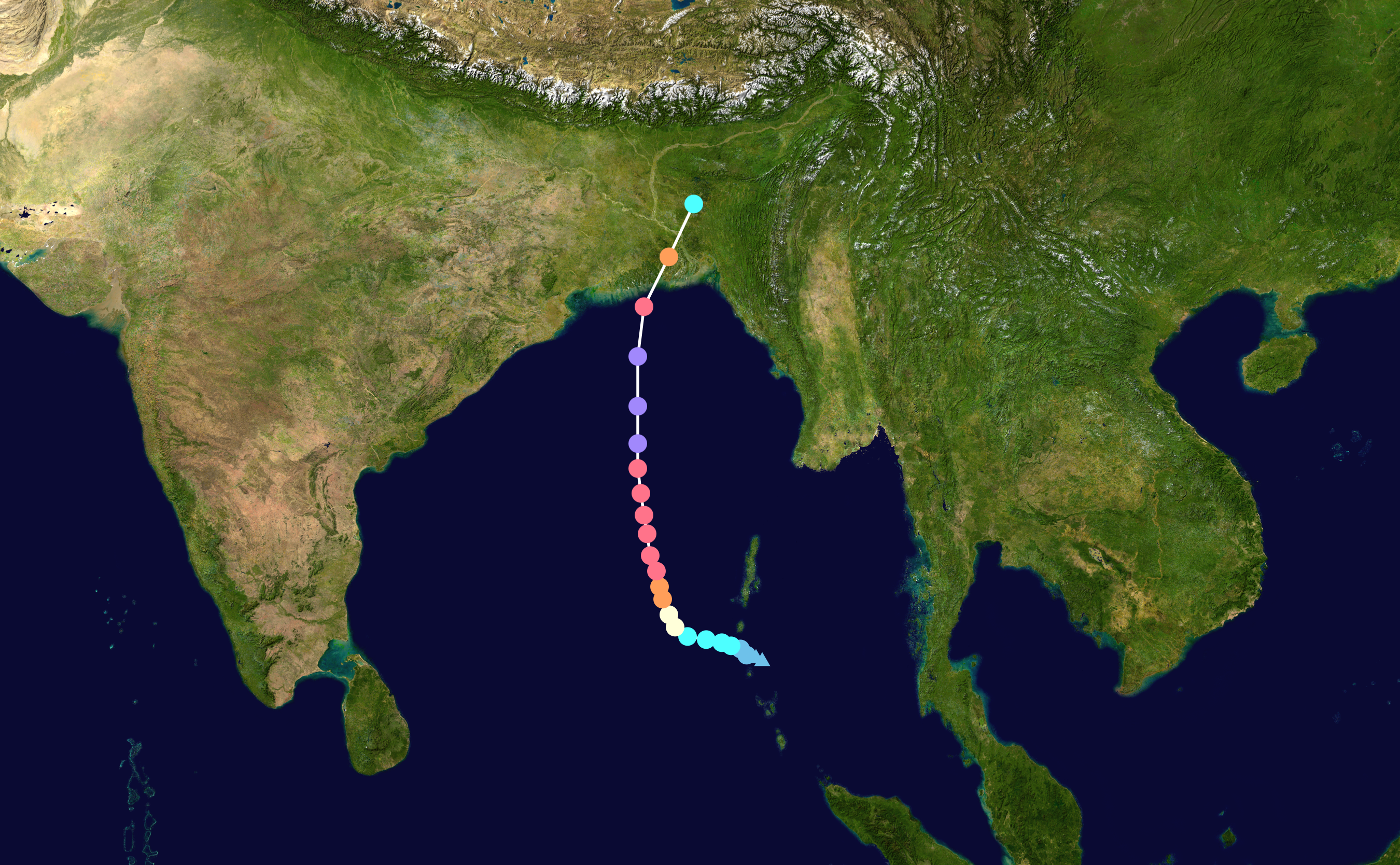
Map plotting the storm's track and intensity, according to the Saffir–Simpson scale Map key Saffir–Simpson scale Tropical depression (≤38 mph, ≤62 km/h) Tropical storm (39–73 mph, 63–118 km/h) Category 1 (74–95 mph, 119–153 km/h) Category 2 (96–110 mph, 154–177 km/h) Category 3 (111–129 mph, 178–208 km/h) Category 4 (130–156 mph, 209–251 km/h) Category 5 (≥157 mph, ≥252 km/h) Unknown Storm type Tropical cyclone Subtropical cyclone Extratropical cyclone, remnant low, tropical disturbance, or monsoon depression

On November 9, an area of disturbed weather developed southeast of the Andaman Islands, with a weak low-level circulation near the Nicobar Islands. Initially moderate upper-level wind shear inhibited organization, while strong diffluence aloft aided in developing convection. Vertical shear decreased greatly as the circulation became better defined, and a Tropical Cyclone Formation Alert was issued on November 11 while located a short distance south of the Andaman Islands. Around the same time, the India Meteorological Department (IMD) designated the system as Depression BOB 09. The Joint Typhoon Warning Center (JTWC) upgraded it to Tropical Cyclone 06B after Dvorak estimates indicated winds of 65 km/h (40 mph). Later that day, it intensified into a deep depression as it moved slowly north-westward.

The IMD upgraded the system to Cyclonic Storm Sidr early on November 12. The system then began to intensify quickly as it moved slowly northwestward, and the IMD upgraded it to a severe cyclonic storm later that day and a very severe cyclonic storm early the next day. On the morning of November 15, the cyclone intensified to reach peak winds of 215 km/h (135 mph) according to the IMD, and a peak of 260 km/h (160 mph) according to the JTWC best track. Sidr officially made landfall around 17:00 UTC later that day, with sustained winds of 215 km/h (135 mph). It weakened rapidly after landfall and the final advisories were issued early on November 16.

== Preparations ==
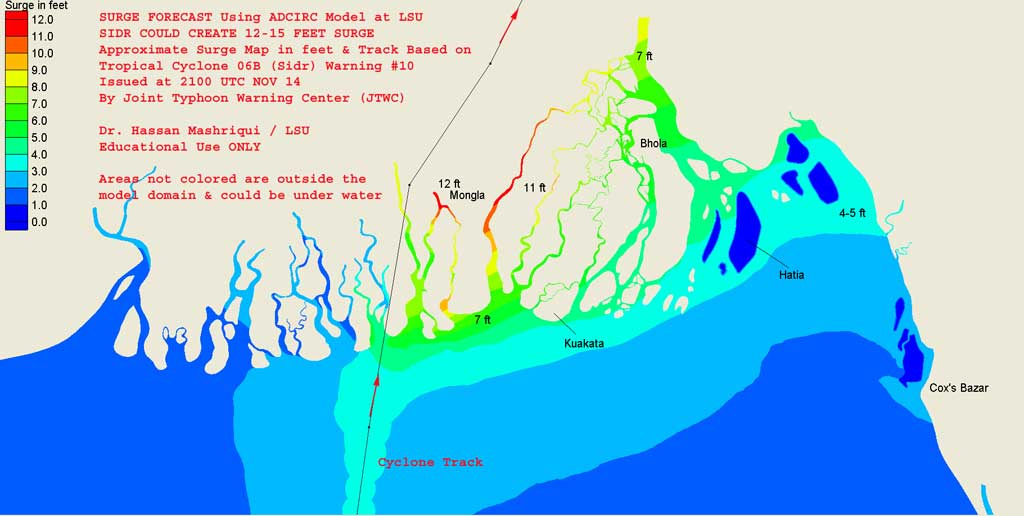
Storm surge forecasted on November 14 by numerical model

As it intensified to a Category 4-equivalent cyclone on November 15, thousands of emergency officials were put on standby in eastern India and Bangladesh in advance of the storm's arrival. Forecast heights of the storm surge predicted by a numerical model developed by Dr. Hassan Mashriqui (Louisiana State University) was communicated to the emergency response authorities in Bangladesh, prompting a massive evacuation of low-lying coastal areas. A total of 2 million people in Bangladesh evacuated to emergency shelters. The Indian Metrological Department (IMD) also issued a cyclone alert for Odisha and West Bengal on November 14. In Bangladesh, an emergency cabinet meeting decided to withdraw weekly leave for the government officials to join the evacuation process. Over 40,000 Red Crescent volunteers were deployed to order residents in the 15 affected provinces into special cyclone and flood shelters. The main ports had been closed.

== Impact ==
Cyclone Sidr making landfall in Bangladesh.

Coastal districts of Bangladesh faced heavy rainfall as an early impact of the cyclone. Dhaka and other parts of Bangladesh experienced drizzle and gusty winds. Total losses reached 196.25 billion taka (US$2.31 billion).

Storm surges reaching up to a height of 3 metres (9.8 ft) were reported in the coastal areas of north Chennai in southern state of Tamil Nadu in India, triggering panic among the fishing community.

The damage in Bangladesh was extensive, including tin shacks flattened, houses and schools blown away and enormous tree damage. Some local officials have described the damage as being even worse than that from the 1991 cyclone. The entire cities of Patuakhali, Barguna and Jhalokati District were hit hard by the storm surge of over 5 meters (16 ft). About a quarter of the world heritage site Sunderbans were damaged. Researchers said mangrove forest Sunderban will take at least 40 years to recover itself from this catastrophe. Much of the capital city of Dhaka was also severely affected, as electricity and water service were cut and significant damage was reported there due to winds and flooding. The local agricultural industry was also devastated, as many rice crops — which have a December harvest — were lost.

At least 3,447 deaths have been reported. The hardest-hit area was Barguna, where 423 people were reported to have been killed, according to local officials. Patuakhali was also hard-hit, with 385 deaths reported. Most of the deaths confirmed thus far were due to the winds, although 13 of them have been as a result of capsized boats in the Faridpur district of Bangladesh. The head of the Red Crescent in Bangladesh expected the death toll to reach as high as 15,000. Over 3,000 other fishermen were reported missing on over 500 fishing boats. The maximum estimated death toll from Sidr in the densely populated region is over 15,000.

== Disaster response ==
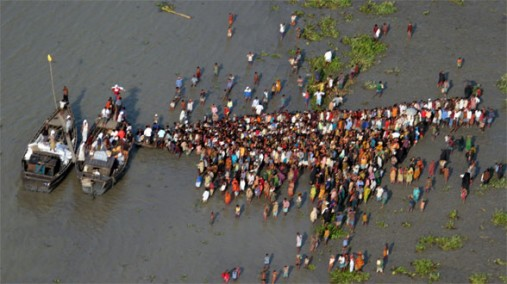
People affected by the cyclone lining up for aid boats in Bangladesh

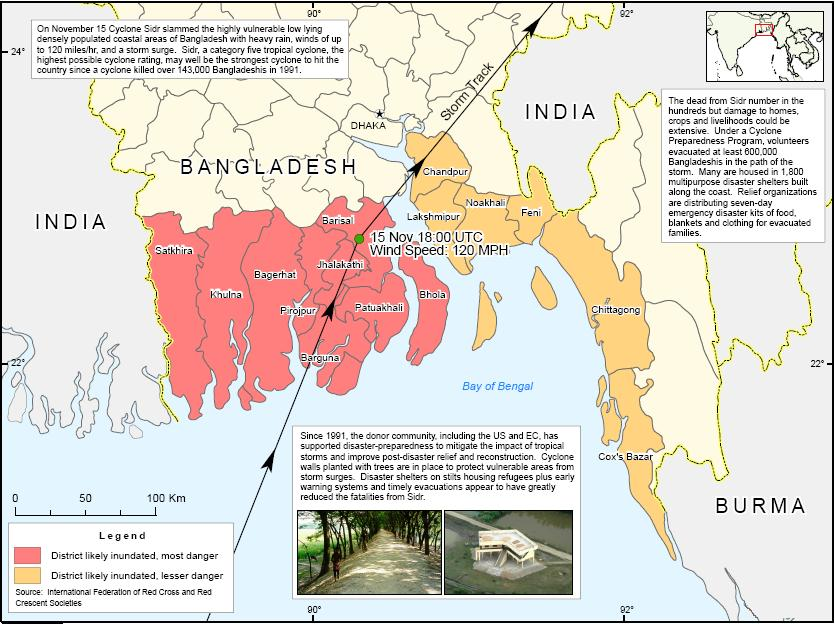
Map showing affected districts and disaster response.

Cyclone Sidr slammed the highly vulnerable low lying densely populated coastal areas of Bangladesh with heavy rain, winds of up to 190 km/h (120 mph), and a storm surge. Sidr may be the strongest cyclone to hit the country since a cyclone killed over 143,000 Bangladeshis in 1991. Although, the deaths from Sidr number in the thousands but damage to homes, crops and livelihoods could be extensive and were reportedly worst. Effective early warning, cyclone shelters and disaster relief measure implementations helped reduce the death toll. Under a Cyclone Preparedness Program, volunteers evacuated at least 600,000 Bangladeshis in the path of the storm. Many are housed in 1,800 multipurpose disaster shelters built along the coast. Relief organizations distributed seven-day emergency disaster kits of food, blankets and clothing for evacuated families.

Since 1991, the donor community, including the US and EC, has supported disaster-preparedness to mitigate the impact of tropical storms and improve post-disaster relief and reconstruction. Cyclone walls planted within trees are in place to protect vulnerable areas from storm surges. Disaster shelters on stilts housing refugees plus early warning systems and timely evacuations appear to have greatly reduced the fatalities from Sidr. It killed around 15,000 people, the highest number since a cyclone killed roughly 140,000 in the region in 1991.

With wind velocities of up to 260 km/h, Cyclone Sidr has been named one of the 10 strongest and deadliest cyclones to strike the region of Bangladesh between 1876 and 2010.

== Aftermath ==
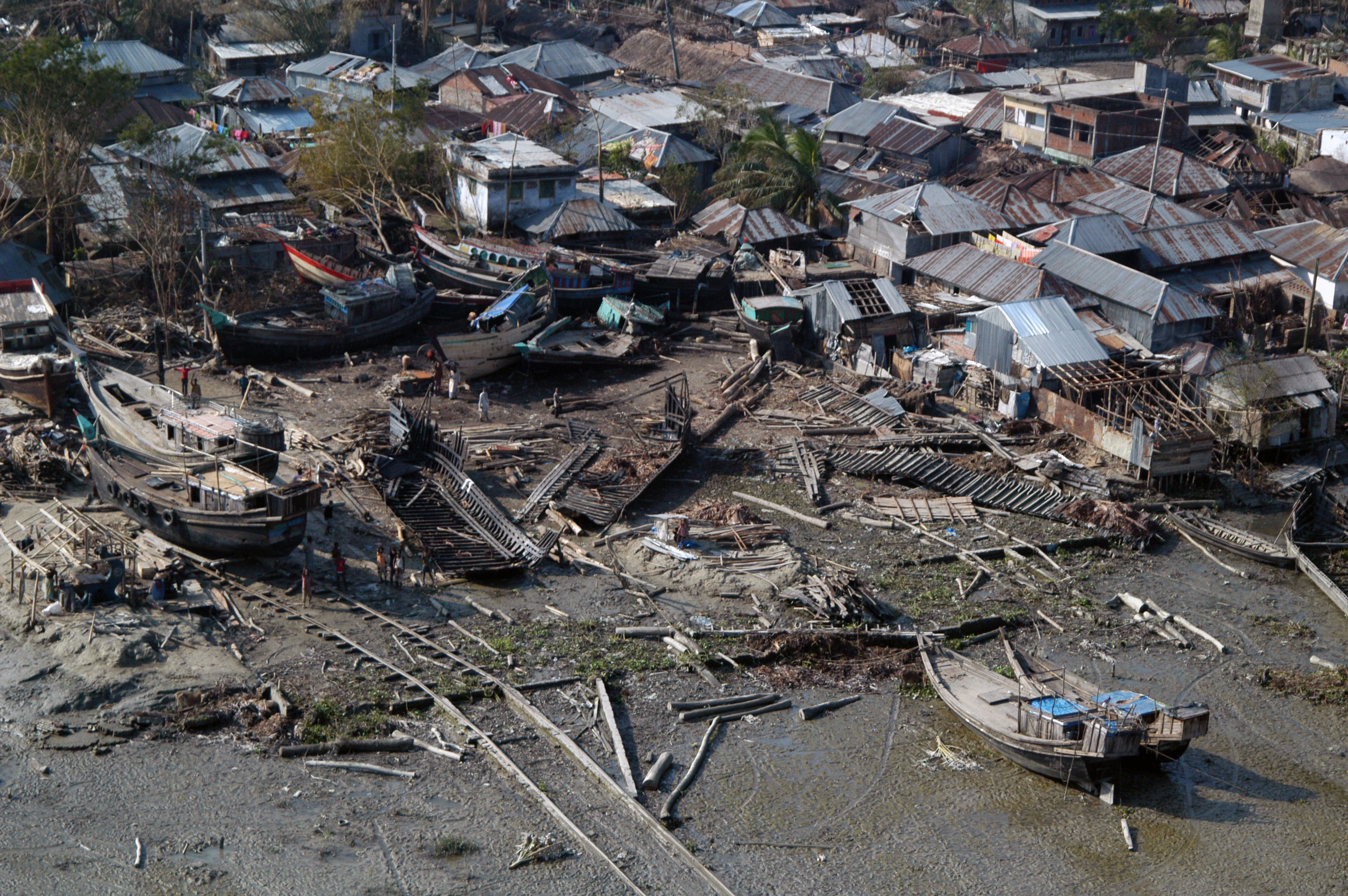
Houses damaged by the cyclone.

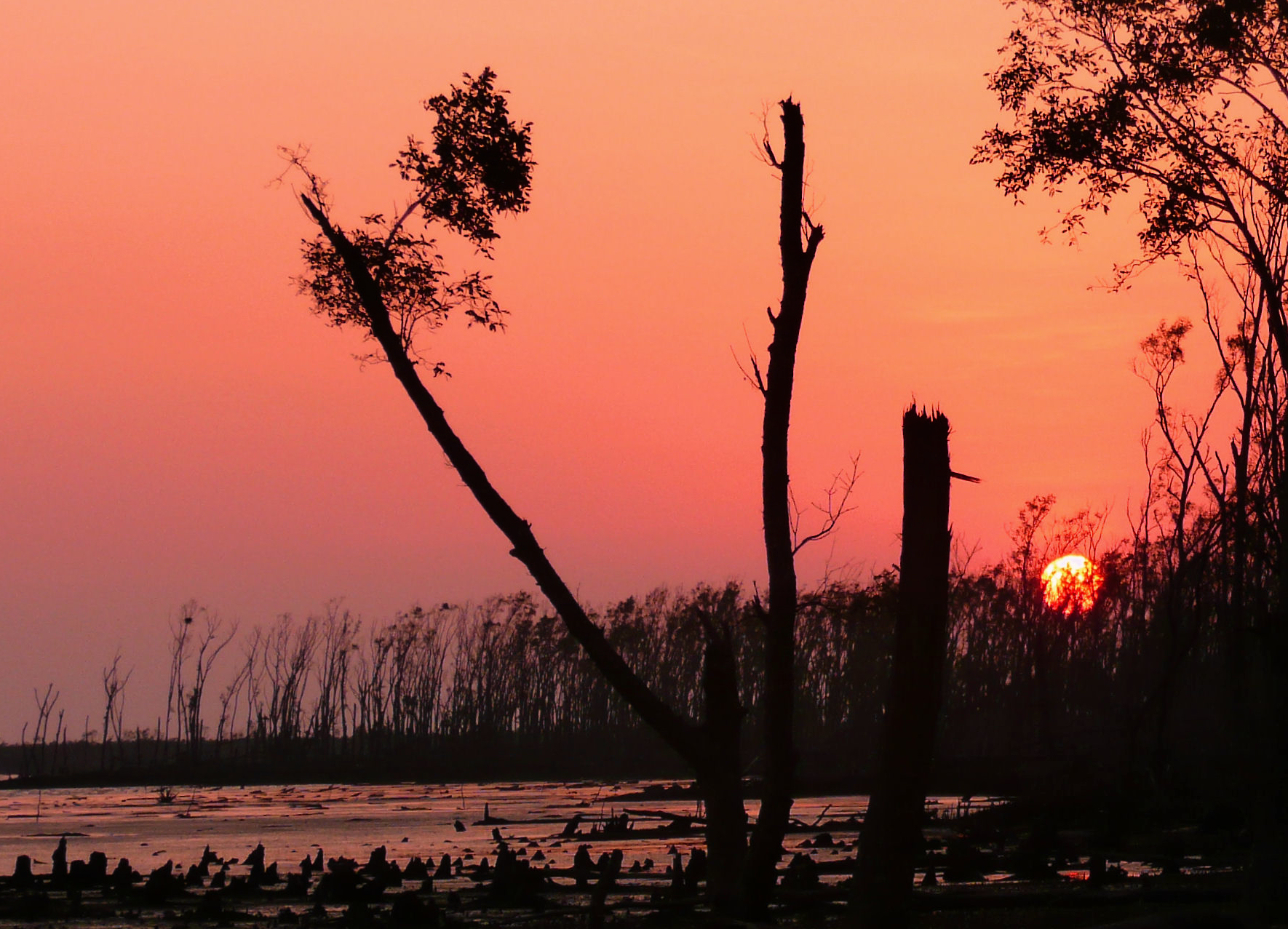
Sundarbans a few months after Cyclone Sidr

=== National response ===
After the storm, 18 Bangladesh Air Force helicopters and five Bangladesh Navy ships were immediately dispatched with food, medicine, and relief supplies for the hardest-hit areas. Bangladesh Red Crescent Society initially asked 400 million Taka (US$5,807,594) to the international community. As part of the Bangladeshi cricket team's tour in New Zealand, a charity Twenty20 match was held with all funds raised going to the victims. In addition, the International Cricket Council donated US$250,000 to the funds at the start of the match. The Ministry of Food and Disaster Management allocated 4,000 metric tonnes of rice, 7,500 tents, 18,000 blankets, and 30 million Taka (US$435,569) in relief grants. About 13,000 housing packages, consisting of iron sheets for roofing and family kits were prepared for immediate distribution. A special 350 million Taka (US$5,081,645) fund for housing was established by November 22, 2007. At that time, 732 medical teams were deployed to the affected areas.

=== International response ===
A total of 27 countries or local Red Crosses sent $115 million in aid. The Saudi government sent $100 million for urgent requirements. The government of Norway contributed $4.2 million through various organizations. The government of Italy provided $3 million worth of wheat towards food security. The government of the Netherlands sent $1.5 million through the Red Cross. The Red Crescent Society of Iran provided $1 million in the form of goods and relief transport. The Turkish government sent $1 million in emergency assistance.

=== Post-storm diseases ===
People of the cyclone affected area experienced severe health problems such as diseases like diarrhea, which spread due to shortage of drinking water. The landfall of Sidr had followed the devastation caused by consecutive floods earlier in 2007. By January 15, 2008, the World Health Organization (WHO) reported that 44 people had Jaundice, 3,572 had Diarrhoea, 3,210 had Pneumonia, 7,538 were suffering from a skin disease, 2,309 had eye infections, and 10,349 had Typhoid Fever. To help reduce further spreading of the diseases, the Government of Norway provided the WHO with four water treatment plants to be used in areas affected by Sidr.

== See also ==
- List of Bangladesh tropical cyclones
- List of tropical cyclone records
- List of North Indian cyclone seasons
- Geography of Bangladesh
- Timeline of the 2007 North Indian Ocean cyclone season
- 1970 Bhola cyclone – The deadliest cyclone ever recorded, following a similar path, also making landfall in November.
- Cyclone Gonu
- Cyclone Fani
- Cyclone Amphan
- Cyclone Mocha
