= 1876 Bengal cyclone =

North Indian Ocean cyclone that hit Bengal in 1876

Great Backerganj Cyclone of 1876
Meteorological history
- Formed: 29 October 1876
- Dissipated: 1 November 1876

Super cyclonic storm
- 3-minute sustained (IMD)
- Highest winds: 220 km/h (140 mph)
- Lowest pressure: 945 hPa (mbar); 27.91 inHg

Category 4-equivalent tropical cyclone
- 1-minute sustained (SSHWS)
- Highest winds: 230 km/h (145 mph)

Overall effects
- Fatalities: 200,000 total
- Damage: Unknown
- Areas affected: Backergunge District, British India (near Meghna estuary in present-day Barisal, Bangladesh)
- Part of the 1876 North Indian Ocean cyclone season

The Great Backerganj Cyclone of 1876 (29 October – 1 November 1876) was one of the deadliest tropical cyclones in history. It hit the coast of Backerganj, Bengal Presidency, British India (near Meghna estuary in present-day Barisal, Bangladesh), killing about 200,000 people, half of whom were drowned by the storm surge, while the rest died from the subsequent famine.

== Meteorological history ==
The system originated on October 27, 1876, as a broad, unstructured area of low pressure over the southeastern reaches of the Bay of Bengal, initially centered near coordinates 10.0°N and 89.0°E. At the time, the regional atmospheric profile was deeply altered by an unseasonably warm oceanic heat content, with sea surface temperatures exceeding 29°C (84°F). This reservoir of thermal energy was paired with exceptionally weak vertical wind shear and robust, low-level monsoonal convergence. These thermodynamic factors allowed the broad disturbance to rapidly consolidate its convective core around a distinct center of rotation. As the newborn tropical depression drifted slowly toward the northwest, it began drafting immense volumes of moisture from the warm open waters, initiating a steady tightening of its barometric gradient.

As the low-pressure system crossed into the central Bay of Bengal, it encountered an optimized environment characterized by enhanced upper-level divergence. On October 30, while positioned near 15.0°N and 89.0°E, the system underwent an abrupt structural evolution and was officially upgraded to a cyclonic storm. Almost immediately following this designation, the storm's forward trajectory shifted sharply toward the north-northeast, aligning with a steering ridge over mainland Southeast Asia. This trajectory channeled the tightening vortex directly into the deep, unrestricted waters of the North Bay of Bengal. During this transit, the cyclone entered a phase of explosive deepening. Its central barometric pressure cratered as a tight, symmetrical eye wall formed at its core, surrounded by intense hurricane-force winds. Historical re-analysis and barometric data reconstructed by the India Meteorological Department estimate that at its peak intensity, the system reached a minimum central sea-level pressure of 945 hPa (mbar) and maximum 1-minute sustained winds of 230 km/h (145 mph). This profile placed the system at high-end Category 4 equivalent intensity on the modern Saffir–Simpson scale, designating it as a super cyclonic storm.

In the early morning hours of October 31, 1876, the apex of the severe cyclonic storm made direct landfall over the Meghna River estuary in the Backerganj district (present-day Barisal, Bangladesh). The physical mechanics of the landfall were heavily compounded by an exceptional astronomical coincidence: the storm's core arrived during a full moon, precisely when the local astronomical spring tides reached their maximum diurnal peaks. The shallow, funnel-like bathymetry of the northern Bay of Bengal acted as a geographic amplifier. As the hurricane-force wind field drove the massive oceanic shelf forward, it created a devastating hydrological anomaly. A succession of three distinct, massive storm waves swept inland, acting as a vertical wall of water that reached absolute peaks between 3 and 13.6 meters (9.8 to 44.6 feet) above the mean sea level. This inundation completely overwhelmed the outward flow of the Ganges and Meghna river systems. The resulting storm tide—historically recognized as one of the highest and most destructive ever documented—surprised communities in their beds without warning. It completely submerged over 3,000 square miles (7,800 km²) of low-lying coastal land within less than an hour, entirely erasing infrastructure on the delta islands of Dakhin Shahabazpur, Hattia, and Sandwip.

Following its catastrophic landfall over the Meghna estuary, the physical structure of the super cyclonic storm began to decay rapidly. As the system moved further inland across the flat but expansive terrain of eastern Bengal, it was cut off from its vital maritime energy source. The immense surface friction generated by the coastal delta landforms severely disrupted the storm's boundary layer, causing its tight low-level wind circulation to destabilize and shear apart. By the afternoon of October 31, the core wind velocity had fallen far below hurricane thresholds, and the eye wall structures completely collapsed. Rather than transforming into a traditional baroclinic system through an extratropical transition—a process structurally barred by the lack of strong baroclinic zones, thermal gradients, or mid-latitude jet stream interactions over the warm tropical plains of Bengal—the system experienced direct dissipation. It was progressively downgraded to a tropical depression as it moved toward the northeast. Its central pressure rose rapidly as the low-level cyclonic rotation thoroughly unraveled. The moisture-depleted, structurally sheared remnants of the system officially dissipated over mainland Asia on November 1, 1876, leaving behind a completely waterlogged and structurally devastated landscape.

== Impact, Famine, and Imperial Aftermath ==
The immediate physical toll of the storm surge was unprecedented. Somewhere between 100,000 and 150,000 individuals were drowned instantly as the wall of water reclaimed the low-lying coastal plains. The hyper-saline ocean water left behind by the receding surge caused long-term environmental ruin. It salted fertile agricultural fields, drowned over 100,000 head of cattle, and completely contaminated freshwater wells across the Backerganj, Noakhali, and Chittagong districts.

In the immediate weeks following the cyclone's dissipation, the destruction of standing rice crops and stored grain stocks triggered a massive, compounding humanitarian crisis. The stagnant, contaminated water pools became ideal vectors for rampant disease, launching a severe regional cholera epidemic. This epidemic, paired with widespread famine, killed an additional 100,000 to 165,000 people over the winter of 1876.

The disaster was heavily exacerbated by the laissez-faire economic practices of the British colonial administration under the Raj. Reluctant to deploy relief funds or install protective embankments, colonial administrators viewed the high mortality rates through a strict bureaucratic lens, heavily prioritizing tax revenue over human rescue. In total, the direct and indirect death toll of the Great Backerganj Cyclone is estimated between 215,000 and 315,000 victims, making it one of the absolute worst humanitarian catastrophes of the 19th century.

== See also ==
- List of tropical cyclone records
- List of Bangladesh tropical cyclones
- 1970 Bhola cyclone – The deadliest tropical cyclone in recorded history, which impacted the exact same geographic region.
- 1991 Bangladesh cyclone
- Cyclone Nargis
- North Indian Ocean tropical cyclone
- An Imperial Disaster: The Bengal Cyclone of 1876
