= List of Bangladesh tropical cyclones =

Bangladesh suffers from devastating tropical cyclones frequently, due to its unique geographic location. The funnel-shaped northern portion of the Bay of Bengal amplifies the storm surge of landfalling tropical cyclones, affecting thousands of people. Some of the most devastating natural disasters in recorded history with high casualties were tropical cyclones that hit the region comprising present-day Bangladesh. Among them, the 1970 Bhola cyclone alone claimed approximately 300,000 to 500,000 lives, making it the deadliest tropical cyclone on record.

== History ==
Tropical cyclones affecting Bangladesh have killed about 1.54 million people in the Bengal region.

Bangladesh Space Research and Remote Sensing Organisation (SPARRSO), a government agency under the Ministry of Defence provides storm predictions and early warnings using feeds from NASA and NOAA's satellites. The warnings are usually given on a scale of 10, with 10 being used for the deadliest storms.

A detailed program for storm prevention was outlined by the government following the cyclone of 1991. A Comprehensive Cyclone Preparedness Programme (CPP) is jointly planned, operated, and managed by the Ministry of Disaster Management and Relief and the Bangladesh Red Crescent Society; a volunteer force of more than 32,000 are trained to help in warning and evacuation in the coastal areas. Around 2,500 cyclone shelters have been constructed in the coastal regions. The shelters are built on elevated platforms and serve the dual role of schools or community centers during normal weather. In Patenga, Chittagong, the coast has been heavily protected with concrete levees. Also, afforestation has been initiated in the coastal regions to create a green belt.

== Storms ==
=== Historical record ===
- Source: SMRC-No.1 – The impact of tropical cyclones on the coastal regions of SAARC countries and their influence in the region, SAARC Meteorological Research Center (SMRC),1998

SL. No.	Date/Year	Type of Disturbance	Deaths	Relevant Information	Reference/Source of Information
1.	1582 AD (Date and month N/A)	Severe Cyclonic Storm with a core of hurricane winds	~200,000 killed	Coast: The cyclone crossed the coast of Backerganj (Sarkar Bala). Loss and damage: People killed = about 200,000 killed. The destruction was reported to have been caused by a storm wave. According to Banglapedia, a five-hour hurricane and thunderstorm destroyed houses and boats in the coast near Bakerganj (presently in Barisal and Patuakhali). Only Hindu temples with a strong foundation were spared.	Ain-i-Akbari; Riyaz-Us-Salatin; Bengal District Gazetteer, 24 Parganas-by L.S.S. O'Malley, ICS, 1914, published- by the Bengal SOC Dept.
2.	1585 (Date and month N/A)	N/A		A tropical storm hit the eastern side of Bakerganj (now Barisal) near the mouth of the Meghna River estuary, causing devastation of crops. Casualty: unknown.	Banglapedia
3.	1699 (Date and month N/A)	Severe Cyclonic Storm	~50,000 killed	Coast: The cyclone crossed the Sundarbans coast Loss and damage: Other information is not available.	Daily Ittefaq, 5 May 1991.
4.	1760 (Date and month N/A)	Severe Cyclonic Storm		Coast: The cyclone crossed the Sundarbans coast Loss and damage: N/A. The whole area was almost damaged. Other information is not available.	Daily Ittefaq, 5 May 1991.
5.	1765 (Date and month N/A)	Severe Cyclonic Storm		Coast: The cyclone crossed Chittagong coast Loss and damage: N/A. The whole area was destroyed. Other information is not available.	Daily Ittefaq, 5 May 1991.
6.	1767 (Date and month N/A)	Severe Cyclonic Storm	30,000	Coast: The cyclone crossed Backerganj (Barisal) coast. Surge height: 13.03 m (43 ft) Loss and damage: People killed: 30,000. Other information is not available.	Daily Ittefaq, 5 May 1991.
7.	May–June 1797 (exact date N/A)	Severe Cyclonic Storm with a core of hurricane winds		Coast: The cyclone crossed Chittagong coast Loss and damage: Every house in the area was destroyed. Two ships were sunk in Chittagong Port. Other information is not available.	Bangladesh Meteorological Department; Banglapedia
8.	June 1822 (Actual date N/A)	Severe Cyclonic Storm with a core of hurricane winds	50,000	Coast: The cyclone crossed the coast of Backerganj (Barisal), Sarkar Bala. Loss and damage: People killed = 50,000. Cattle killed = 100,000. Storm wave swept away the collectorate records. Other information is not available.	Journal of Asiatic SOC. of Bengal, Vol. 46, Part II, pp 332- by H.F. Blandford; Buist's 1st catalogue Trans. Bombay Geo. Soc. Vol. XII. Appendix A.; Sailors Horn Book for the law of storms. Appendix A. – by Henry Piddington.
9.	2 June 1823	Cyclonic Storm		Coast: The cyclone crossed Chittagong coast Other information is not available.	Disastrous storms in the Bay of Bengal, A Listing of Cyclonic Storms by Month Through 1979, Prepared for the Office of U.S. Foreign Disaster Assistance Agency for International Development, Washington D.C. 20523 – by F. Henderson.
10.	8 June 1824	Heavy Storm (Severe Cyclonic Storm)	Coast: The cyclone crossed Chittagong coast Other information is not available.	Disastrous storms in the Bay of Bengal, A Listing of Cyclonic Storms by Month Through 1979, Prepared for the Office of U.S. Foreign Disaster Assistance Agency for International Development, Washington D.C. 20523 – by F. Henderson.	
11.	31 October 1831	Severe Cyclonic Storm	22,000	Coast: The cyclone crossed Barisal coast (Grazed the Balasore-Orissa coast) Surge height: 2.12–4.55 m (7–15 ft) Loss and damage: People killed = 22,000 (along the coast of India and Bengal) Cattle killed > 50,000 Other information is not available.	Bangladesh Meteorological Department.; Bengal District Gazetteer (Balasore)- by L.S.S. O'Malley, ICS
12.	3–5 June 1839	Cyclonic Storm		Coast: Crossed Head Bay (Bengal coast) Other information is not available.	Disastrous storms in the Bay of Bengal, A Listing of Cyclonic Storms by Month Through 1979, Prepared for the Office of U.S. Foreign Disaster Assistance Agency for International Development, Washington D.C. 20523 – by F. Henderson.
13.	19–21 September 1839	Cyclonic Storm		Coast: The storm passed north across Sundarbans coast between Calcutta and Barisal. Other information is not available.	Disastrous storms in the Bay of Bengal, A Listing of Cyclonic Storms by Month Through 1979, Prepared for the Office of U.S. Foreign Disaster Assistance Agency for International Development, Washington D.C. 20523 – by F. Henderson.
14.	11 May 1844	Cyclonic Storm (Gale)		Coast: Crossed Noakhali and Chittagong coast. Other information is not available.	Disastrous storms in the Bay of Bengal, A Listing of Cyclonic Storms by Month Through 1979, Prepared for the Office of U.S. Foreign Disaster Assistance Agency for International Development, Washington D.C. 20523 – by F. Henderson.
	1847	Cyclonic storm	~75,000 killed	Various locations in Bengal	Dipankar C. Patnaik & N. Sivagnanam (November 2007). "DISASTER VULNERABILITY OF COASTAL STATES: A Short Case Study of Orissa, India". Social Science Research Network. p. 4. SSRN 1074845. Missing or empty
15.	12–13 May 1849	Cyclonic Storm (Gale)		Coast: The cyclone crossed Chittagong coast Other information is not available.	Disastrous storms in the Bay of Bengal, A Listing of Cyclonic Storms by Month Through 1979, Prepared for the Office of U.S. Foreign Disaster Assistance Agency for International Development, Washington D.C. 20523 – by F. Henderson.
16.	23–28 April 1850	Cyclonic Storm	Formation: Formed over West Nicobars. Coast: It moved north to Bengal from West Nicobars. Other information is not available.	Disastrous storms in the Bay of Bengal, A Listing of Cyclonic Storms by Month Through 1979, Prepared for the Office of U.S. Foreign Disaster Assistance Agency for International Development, Washington D.C. 20523 – by F. Henderson.	
17.	12–15 May 1852	Cyclonic Storm		Formation: Formed near 15°N. Coast: It moved northward and crossed the Sundarbans coast; the center passed 39 miles (63 km) east of Calcutta Other information is not available.	Disastrous storms in the Bay of Bengal, A Listing of Cyclonic Storms by Month Through 1979, Prepared for the Office of U.S. Foreign Disaster Assistance Agency for International Development, Washington D.C. 20523 – by F. Henderson.
	1864	Kolkata Cyclone	More than 60,000 Bengalis were killed in Kolkata	Kolkata and Bengal	Most houses collapsed and more than 60,000 Bengali children were killed due to severe head injuries in Kolkata Most houses collapsed and more than 60,000 Bengali children were killed in Kolkata due to severe head injuries in Kolkata Most houses collapsed and more than 60,000 Bengalis were killed due to severe head injuries in Kolkata Most houses collapsed and more and 60,000 Indians were killed due to severe head injuries in Kolkata Most houses collapsed and more and 60,000 Indian children were killed due to severe head injuries in Kolkata
18.	13–17 May 1869	Cyclonic Storm		The storm moved northwestward from Cape Negrais to Bengal and crossed the Bengal coast Other information is not available.	Disastrous storms in the Bay of Bengal, A Listing of Cyclonic Storms by Month Through 1979, Prepared for the Office of U.S. Foreign Disaster Assistance Agency for International Development, Washington D.C. 20523 – by F. Henderson.
19.	5–10 June 1869	Cyclonic Storm	Coast: From the North Bay the cyclone passed over Bengal. Other information is not available.	Disastrous storms in the Bay of Bengal, A Listing of Cyclonic Storms by Month Through 1979, Prepared for the Office of U.S. Foreign Disaster Assistance Agency for International Development, Washington D.C. 20523 – by F. Henderson.	
20.	October 1872 (Date was not available)	Cyclonic Storm	Coast: The cyclone hit the coast of Cox's Bazar Other information is not available.	Disastrous storms in the Bay of Bengal, A Listing of Cyclonic Storms by Month Through 1979, Prepared for the Office of U.S. Foreign Disaster Assistance Agency for International Development, Washington D.C. 20523 – by F. Henderson.; Banglapedia	
21.	29 October – 1 November 1876 (The Great Backerganj Cyclone of 1876)	Severe Cyclonic Storm with a core of hurricane winds.	~200,000 killed	Coast: The cyclone crossed the coast of Backerganj (present Barisal) near Meghna estuary. Maximum wind: 220 km/h (119 knots) Surge height: 3–13.6 m (10–45 ft) According to Banglapedia, a cyclone with a storm-surge of 12.2 metres (40 ft) hit Meghna River estuary near Chittagong, Barisal, and Noakhali. Casualty: about 200,000. The storm also caused epidemic and famine, and vast property damage.	Disastrous storms in the Bay of Bengal, A Listing of Cyclonic Storms by Month Through 1979, Prepared for the Office of U.S. Foreign Disaster Assistance Agency for International Development, Washington D.C. 20523 – by F. Henderson.; BMD; Hurricane Storms and tornadoes- by D.V. Nalivkin, 1982, pp. 68.; Journal of Asiatic Soc. Vol. XL VI- by H.F. Blanford pp. 338.; Tracks of Storms and Depressions in the Bay of Bengal and the Arabian Sea, 1877–1970, IMD, 1979.; Banglapedia
22.	24 October 1897	Cyclonic Storm	14,000	Coast:Kutubdia island near Chittagong. Casualty: 14,000. The resulting epidemic of Cholera killed another 18,000	The Mercury (Hobart, Tas. : 1860 - 1954) ---
23.	May 1898 (Date N/A)	Tropical cyclone with storm surge		Coast:Teknaf Casualty: unknown	---
24.	November 1904 (Date N/A)	Cyclonic storm	143	Coast:Sonadia 143 killed and fishing fleet wrecked.	---
25.	16 October 1909	Cyclonic Storm	698	Coast:Khulna Casualty: 698 people and 70,654 cattle.	---
26.	October 1913 (Actual Date N/A)	Cyclonic Storm	500	Coast:Muktagachha upazila (Mymensingh District) A tropical cyclone, having moved inland destroyed villages. Casualty: 500 people.	---
27.	24 September 1917	Cyclonic Storm	432	Coast:Khulna Casualty: 432 people and 28,029 cattle.	---
28.	May 1941 (Date N/A)	Cyclonic Storm		Coast:Eastern Meghna River estuary Casualty: unknown.	---
29.	October 1942 (date N/A)	Cyclonic Storm	Coast:The Sundarbans Casualty: unknown.	---	
30.	17–19 May 1948	Cyclonic Storm	1,200	Coast:Deltan between Chittagong and Noakhali Casualty: approximately 1,200 people and 20,000 cattle.	---
31.	16–19 May 1958	Cyclonic Storm	870	Coast:East and West Meghna River estuary, east of Barisal and Noakhali Casualty: 870 people and 14,500. Also standing crops were destroyed.	---
32.	21–24 October 1958	Cyclonic Storm	Coast:Chittagong Casualty:Approx. 100,000 families were rendered homeless.	---	
33.	9–10 October 1960	Severe Cyclonic Storm	Coast:Eastern Meghna River estuary near Noakhali, Bakerganj, Faridpur and Patuakhali. Maximum Wind:201 km/hour Maximum Surge: 3.05 metres Casualty: 3,000 people. Other effects: 62,725 houses destroyed. Crops on 94,000 acres (380 km^{2}) of land were destroyed	---	
34.	30–31 October 1960	Severe Cyclonic Storm	Coast:Chittagong, Noakhali, Bakerganj, Faridpur, Patuakhali and eastern Meghna estuary Maximum Wind:210 km/h Surge: 4.5–6.1 m Casualty: about 10,000 people, 27,793 cattle . Losses: 568,161 houses destroyed (including 70% houses in Hatiya). Also, two large ocean-going ships ran aground in the shore, and 5–7 vessels capsized in Karnaphuli River.	---	
35.	9 May 1961	Severe Cyclonic Storm	11,468	Coast:Bagerhat and Khulna Maximum Wind:161 km/h Surge height:2.44-3.05 m Casualty: 11,468 people (mostly in Char Alexander), 25,000 cattle. Damages: The railway tracks between Noakhali and Harinarayanpur were damaged.	---
36.	26–30 October 1962	Severe Cyclonic Storm	Coast:Feni Maximum Wind:161 km/h Surge height:2.5-3.0 m Casualty: about 1,000 people, many domestic cattle.	---	
37.	28–29 May 1963	Severe Cyclonic Storm	Coast:Chittagong, Noakhali, Cox's Bazar and coastal islands of Sandwip, Kutubdia, Hatiya and Maheshkhali. Maximum Wind:203 km/h (164 km/h at Cox's Bazar) Surge height:4.3-5.2 m Casualty: 11,520 people, 32,617 cattle. Damages: 376,332 houses, 4,787 boats, and standing crops.	---	
38.	11–12 May 1965	Cyclonic Storm	19,279	Coast:Barisal and Bakerganj Maximum Wind:162 km/h Surge height:3.7 m Casualty:19,279 people (out of that, 16,456 in Barisal).	---
39.	14–15 December 1965	Cyclonic Storm	Coast: near Cox's Bazar and Patuakhali Maximum Windspeed:210 km/h at Cox's Bazar Surge height:4.7-6.1 m Casualty 873 people. Damage: 40,000 salt beds destroyed	---	
40.	1 October 1966	Cyclonic Storm	850	Coast:Sandwip, Bakerganj, Khulna, Chittagong, Noakhali and Comilla Surge height:4.7-9.1 m Maximum Wind:146 km/h Total people affected: 1.5 million people. Casualty: 850 people, 65,000 cattle.	---
41.	7-13 November: The 1970 Bhola cyclone	Extremely severe Cyclonic storm	500,000+	Coast:entire coast of Bangladesh (then East Pakistan) Most affected were Chittagong, Barguna, Khepupara, Patuakhali, north of Char Burhanuddin, Char Tazumuddin and south of Maijdi, Haringhata. The official death toll was 500,000 but the number is likely to be higher. Damages include destruction of approximately 20,000 fishing boats, and also property and crops. Total loss of cattle reached more than one million. More than 400,000 houses and 3,500 educational institutions were destroyed. Maximum Wind:222 km/h Maximum Surge:10.6 m.	---
42.	5–6 November 1971	Cyclonic Storm	Coast:Coastal areas of Chittagong Casualty:unknown	---	
43.	28–30 November 1971	Cyclonic Storm	Coast:near the Sundarbans Wind Speed:97–113 km/h Surge height:1 m Effect:Low-lying areas of Khulna town inundated	---	
44.	6–9 December 1973	Cyclonic Storm		Coast:near the Sundarbans Coastal areas near Patuakhali and nearby islands were submerged under the tidal bore.	---
45.	13–15 August 1974	Cyclonic Storm	600	Coast:Khulna Maximum Wind:80.5 km/h Casualty:600 people.	---
46.	24–28 November 1974	Cyclonic Storm	200	Coast:near Cox's Bazar and Chittagong Maximum Wind:161 km/h Surge height:2.8-5.2 m Casualty: 200 people, 1000 cattle. Damages: 2,300 houses destroyed.	---

This is a partial list of the tropical cyclones in Bangladesh or the historical region of Bengal of pre-partitioned India in general. Some of the years and dates may be slightly incorrect. Most of the figures have been taken from Banglapedia.

=== Modern records ===
- 1584: A five-hour hurricane and thunderstorm destroyed houses and boats in the coast near Bakerganj (in present-day Patuakhali and Barisal Districts). Only Hindu temples with a strong foundation were spared. Total casualty: about 200,000.
- 1585: A tropical storm hit the eastern side of Bakerganj (now Barisal) near the mouth of the Meghna River estuary, causing devastation of crops. Casualty: unknown.
- November 1797: A severe cyclone destroyed most of the houses in the Chittagong region. Two ships sank in Chittagong Port.
- May 1822: A cyclone, accompanied by storm surge and tidal bores hit Barisal, Hatiya Island and Noakhali. Casualty: 40,000 people.
- October 1831 Barisal: Casualty: unknown.
- October 1872: A cyclone hit Cox's Bazar. Casualty: unknown.
- 31 October 1876: 1876 Bangladesh cyclone with a storm-surge of 12.2 metres (40 ft) hit Meghna River estuary near Chittagong, Barisal, and Noakhali. Casualty: about 200,000. The storm also caused epidemic and famine, and vast property damage.
- 24 October 1897 Chittagong: A tropical cyclone accompanied by storm surge hit the area hard, especially near the Kutubdia island. Casualty: 14,000. The resulting epidemic of Cholera killed another 18,000.
- May 1898 Teknaf: Tropical cyclone with storm surge. Casualty: unknown.
- November 1904 Sonadia: cyclonic storm; 143 killed and fishing fleet wrecked.
- 16 October 1909 Khulna: A tropical cyclone accompanied by storm surge. Casualty: 698 people and 70,654 cattle.
- October 1913 Muktagachha upazila (Mymensingh District): A tropical cyclone, having moved inland destroyed villages. Casualty: 500 people.
- 24 September 1917 Khulna. A tropical cyclone. Casualty: 432 people and 28,029 cattle.
- May 1941: A cyclonic storm accompanied by storm-surge hit Eastern Meghna River estuary. Casualty: unknown.
- October 1942: A severe cyclonic storm hit The Sundarbans. Casualty: unknown.
- 17–19 May 1948: A cyclonic storm hit the deltan between Chittagong and Noakhali. Casualty: approximately 1,200 people and 20,000 cattle.
- 16–19 May 1958: A cyclonic storm accompanied by storm surge hit east and west Meghna River estuary, east of Barisal and Noakhali. Casualty: 870 people and 14,500. Also standing crops were destroyed.
- 21–24 October 1958: A cyclonic storm struck Chittagong coast. Effect: Approx. 100,000 families were rendered homeless.
- 9–10 October 1960: A severe cyclonic storm hit Eastern Meghna River estuary near Noakhali, Bakerganj, Faridpur and Patuakhali. The storm had wind speeds of up to 201 km/hour. The maximum storm surge was 3.05 metres. It caused devastating damage in Char Jabbar, Char Amina, Char Bhatia, Ramgati, Hatiya and Noakhali. Casualty: 3,000 people. Other effects: 62,725 houses destroyed. Crops on 94,000 acres (380 km^{2}) of land were destroyed.
- 30–31 October 1960: A severe cyclonic storm hit Chittagong, Noakhali, Bakerganj, Faridpur, Patuakhali and eastern Meghna estuary, with winds speed up to 210 km/h. The storm surge reached a height of 4.5–6.1 m. Casualty: about 10,000 people, 27,793 cattle . Losses: 568,161 houses destroyed (including 70% houses in Hatiya). Also, two large ocean-going ships ran aground in the shore, and 5–7 vessels capsized in Karnaphuli River.
- 9 May 1961: A severe cyclonic storm hit Bagerhat and Khulna. It had wind speeds of up to 161 km/h. The storm surge reached 2.44–3.05 m. Casualty: 11,468 people (mostly in Char Alexander), 25,000 cattle. Damages: The railway tracks between Noakhali and Harinarayanpur were damaged.
- 26–30 October 1962: A severe cyclone hit Feni. Maximum windspeed was 161 km/h. The storm surge was 2.5–3.0 m. Casualty: about 1,000 people, many domestic cattle.
- 28–29 May 1963: A severe cyclonic storm devastated Chittagong, Noakhali, Cox's Bazar and coastal islands of Sandwip, Kutubdia, Hatiya and Maheshkhali. The storm surge reached 4.3–5.2 m in Chittagong. Maximum windspeed was up to 203 km/h and at Cox's Bazar 164 km/h. Casualty: 11,520 people, 32,617 cattle. Damages: 376,332 houses, 4,787 boats, and standing crops.
- 11–12 May 1965: A strong cyclone hit Barisal and Bakerganj. The windspeed reached a maximum of 162 km/h. The storm surge was 3.7 m. Casualty:19,279 people (out of that, 16,456 in Barisal).
- 14–15 December 1965: A strong cyclone hit the coast near Cox's Bazar and Patuakhali. The storm surge rose up to 4.7–6.1 m. The windspeed was up to 210 km/h in Cox's Bazar. Casualty" 873 people. Damage: 40,000 salt beds destroyed.
- 1 October 1966: A cyclone hit Sandwip, Bakerganj, Khulna, Chittagong, Noakhali and Comilla. Maximum strong surge was 4.7–9.1 m. The maximum wind speed was 146 km/h. Total people affected: 1.5 million people. Casualty: 850 people, 65,000 cattle.
- 7–13 November: The 1970 Bhola cyclone hit the entire coast of Bangladesh (then East Pakistan). Most affected were Chittagong, Barguna, Khepupara, Patuakhali, north of Char Burhanuddin, Char Tazumuddin and south of Maijdi, Haringhata. The official death toll was 500,000 but the number is likely to be higher. Damages include destruction of approximately 20,000 fishing boats, and also property and crops. Total loss of cattle reached more than one million. More than 400,000 houses and 3,500 educational institutions were destroyed. Maximum windspeed reached about 222 km/h. Maximum storm surge was about 10.6 m.
- 5–6 November 1971: A cyclone hit coastal areas of Chittagong.
- 28–30 November 1971: A cyclonic storm hit the coast near the Sundarbans. Maximum wind speed was 97–113 km/h. The storm surge reached 1 m. Low-lying areas of Khulna town inundated.
- 6–9 December 1973: The coastal areas near the Sundarbans were hit by a cyclone, accompanied by storm surge. Coastal areas near Patuakhali and nearby islands were submerged under the tidal bore.
- 13–15 August 1974: A cyclonic storm hit Khulna. Maximum wind speed reached 80.5 km/h. Casualty:600 people.
- 24–28 November 1974: A cyclone struck the coastal areas near Cox's Bazar and Chittagong, including the offshore islands. Maximum wind speed reached 161 km/h. The storm surge was up to 2.8–5.2 m. Casualty: 200 people, 1000 cattle. Damages: 2,300 houses destroyed.
- 9–12 May 1975: A strong cyclone pummeled Bhola, Cox's Bazar and Khulna. Maximum wind speed was 96.5 to 112.6 km/h. Casualty: 5 people.
- 9–12 May 1977: Khulna, Noakhali, Patuakhali, Barisal, Chittagong and offshore islands were hit by a cyclone. Maximum wind speed was up to 112.63 km/h.
- 14–15 October 1983: A strong cyclone hit the coastal islands and chars near Chittagong and Noakhali. Maximum wind speed reached 122 km/h: Casualty: 43 people. 6 fishing boats and a trawler lost, more than 150 fishermen and 100 fishing boats went missing Damages: 20% of the aman rice crops in the affected regions were destroyed.
- 5–9 November 1983: A cyclone hit Chittagong, Cox's Bazar coast near Kutubdia, St Martin's Island, Teknaf, Ukhia, Moipong, Sonadia, Barisal, Patuakhali and Noakhali. The maximum wind speed reached 136 km/h. The storm surge was 1.52 m. Casualty:300 fishermen with 50 boats missing. Damages:2,000 houses destroyed.
- 24–25 May 1985: A severe cyclone hit Chittagong, Cox's Bazar, Noakhali and coastal islands (Sandwip, Hatiya, and Urirchar). Maximum wind speed at Chittagong was 154 km/h, at Sandwip was 140 km/h, at Cox's Bazar was 100 km/h. The storm surge reached a height of 3.0–4.6 m. Casualty:11,069 people, 135,033 cattle. Damages: 94,379 houses and 74 km of road, and embankments destroyed.
- 8–9 November 1986: A severe cyclonic storm hit the coastal island and chars near Chittagong, Barisal, Patuakhali and Noakhali. Maximum windspeed was 110 km/h at Chittagong and 90 km/h at Khulna. Casualty: 14 people. Damages: 972 km^{2} of paddy fields were inundated; Schools, mosques, warehouses, hospitals, houses and buildings were destroyed at Amtali upazila in Barguna District.
- 24–30 November 1988: A severe cyclonic storm Cyclone 04B struck Jessore, Kushtia, Faridpur and coastal islands of Barisal and Khulna. The maximum windspeed was 162 km/h. The storm was accompanied by a storm surge of 4.5 m at Mongla Port. Casualty: 5,708 people, and numerous wild animals at The Sundarbans (deer 15,000, royal Bengal tiger 9), cattle 65,000. Total damage to crops reached Taka 9.41 billion.
- 18 December 1990: The remnant tropical depression of Severe Cyclonic Storm BOB 09/04B made landfall on 18 December near Cox's Bazar, however, there were no reports of any impact in association with the system.
- 29–30 April 1991: The 1991 Bangladesh cyclone hit Bangladesh late 29 April night. The storm originated in the Indian Ocean and reached the Bay of Bengal coast after 20 days. The diameter of the storm was close to 600 km. The maximum wind speed (observed at Sandwip) reached 225 km/h. At other places, the maximum wind speed was reported as follows: Chittagong 160 km/h, Khepupara (Kalapara) 180 km/h, Kutubdia 180 km/h, Cox's Bazar 185 km/h, and Bhola 178 km/h. (The NOAA-11 satellite estimated the maximum wind speed to be about 240 km/h at 1.38 pm on 29 April). The storm made landfall near the coast north of Chittagong port during the night of the 29 April. The maximum storm surge height reached about 5 to 8 m. Casualty: 150,000 people, 70,000 cattle. Damages: loss of property was estimated at Tk 60 billion.
- 31 May-2 June 1991: A cyclone hit the coastal islands and chars near Patuakhali, Barisal, Noakhali and Chittagong. Maximum wind speed reached 110 km/h. The storm surge was 1.9 m.
- 29 April-3 May 1994: A severe cyclonic storm hit the coastal islands near Cox's Bazar. Maximum windspeed reached 210 km/h. Casualty: 400 people, 8,000 cattle.
- 21–25 November 1995: A severe cyclonic storm hit the coastal islands near Cox's Bazar. The maximum wind speed was up to 210 km/h. Casualty: 650 people, 17,000 cattle.
- 16–19 May 1997: May 1997 Bangladesh cyclone hit the coastal islands and chars near Chittagong, Cox's Bazar, Noakhali and Bhola districts. The maximum wind speed was 225 km/hour, and the storm surge reached 3.05 metres. Casualty: 126 people.
- 25–27 September 1997: A severe cyclonic storm hit coastal islands near Chittagong, Cox's Bazar, Noakhali and Bhola. It had wind speeds of up to 150 km/hour, and a storm surge of 1.83 to 3.05 metres.
- 16–20 May 1998 A severe cyclonic storm with windspeed of 150 km/hour struck coastal islands near Chittagong, Cox's Bazar, and Noakhali. The storm surge was from 1.83 to 2.44 metres.
- 19–22 November 1998: A cyclonic storm, with wind speeds up to 90 km/hour, and a storm surge of 1.22 to 2.44 metres hit coastal islands and sand shoals near Khulna, Barisal, and Patuakhali.
- 14–15 May 2007: Cyclone Akash struck about 115 km south of Chittagong with wind speeds up to 120 km/hour. 14 people were killed and damages amounted to US$982 million.
- 15 November 2007: Cyclone Sidr with wind speeds up to 260 km/hour, made landfall on southern Bangladesh, causing over 3,500 deaths and severe damage.
- 26–27 October 2008: Cyclone Rashmi made landfall on the Bangladesh coast late on 26 October with wind speeds up to 85 km/hour, 15 people were killed and thousands of homes were also damaged.
- 19–21 April 2009: Cyclone Bijli attacked weakly in Bangladesh and not so severe damages were recorded except some houses and crop fields losses.
- 27–29 May 2009: Cyclone Aila attacked offshore 15 districts of south-western part of Bangladesh with wind speeds up to 120 km/hour; about 150 persons killed, 2 lac houses and 3 lac acres of cultivated land and crops losses. Damage in Koyra Upazila amounted to be US$1.45 billion (100 billion taka).
- 16–17 May 2013: Cyclone Viyaru, formerly known as Cyclone Mahasen, hit just south of Feni with wind of 85 km/h. 17 people died, and nearly 1.3 million were affected across the country. Losses to fisheries amounted to US$165 million (12.87 billion taka).
- 29 July 2015: Cyclone Komen with wind speeds up to 75 km/hour, Komen made landfall near Chittagong. About 510,000 houses in the country were damaged or destroyed, and many residents lost their source of income as 667,221 acres (270,000 ha) of crop fields were damaged. The floods killed 132 people, of which at least 39 were directly related to Komen.
- 21 May 2016: Cyclone Roanu made landfall in Sitakunda Upazila, just north of Chittagong and killed 30 people. Damages on coastal embarkments reached US$127 million (10 billion taka).
- 29–31 May 2017: Cyclone Mora with wind speeds up to 110 km/hour, made landfall just south of Chittagong. Strong winds and storm surge battered buildings and destroyed farmlands across Chittagong, Cox's Bazar, and Rangamati, with at least 20,000 houses damaged in refugee camps for Rohingya Muslims displaced by conflict in neighbouring Myanmar. As of 31 May, eighteen people were reported to be killed across Bangladesh, mostly due to falling trees and drowning.
- 4 May 2019: Cyclone Fani moved into Bangladesh after making landfall in Odisha. It killed 17 people in ten districts of Bangladesh. The government estimated the damage at US$63.6 million (5.37 billion taka).
- 9 November 2019: Cyclone Matmo–Bulbul made landfall near West Bengal, and crossed into Bangladesh. It triggered severe flooding and storm surge to the country. 25 people were killed by Matmo–Bulbul, with a damage on agriculture valued at US$31.6 million (2.68 billion taka).
- 20 May 2020: Cyclone Amphan moved into Bangladesh after making landfall in nearby West Bengal. At least 20 people were killed and the cyclone caused US$1.5 billion (127 billion taka) in damage.
- 26 May 2021: Cyclone Yaas hit Bangladesh after causing a lot of damages and destructions in India. Before hitting, strong tidal waves damaged many coastal structures, dames and jetties.
- 6 December 2021: Cyclone Jawad dissipated off the Bangladeshi coast, but triggered flooding in two villages of Khulna District. Fisheries report a loss of US$350,000 (30 million taka).
- 24 October 2022: Cyclone Sitrang made landfall south of Barisal. The cyclone killing 35 people in Bangladesh and left US$34.4 million (3.5 billion taka) in agricultural loss.
- 14 May 2023: The outer bands of Cyclone Mocha affected the eastern Bangladesh and injured 12 people.
- 24 October 2023: Cyclone Hamoon made landfall just south of Chittagong with winds of 95 km/h. The cyclone killed three and injured 63 others.
- 17 November 2023: Cyclone Midhili made landfall near Khepupara, bringing strong winds and heavy rains. 10 people were dead, and brickfield industry reported a loss of US$109 million (12 billion taka).

== See also ==
- List of notable tropical cyclones
- List of disasters in Bangladesh by death toll
