= List of storms named Matmo =

The name Matmo (Chamorro: måtmo, [mɑtmo]) has been used for three tropical cyclones in the western North Pacific Ocean. The name was contributed by the United States and means "heavy rain" in Chamorro. It replaced the name Chataan (Chamorro: chata’an, [tsætæʔæn]), meaning "nonstop rainy day" in Chamorro, after it was retired following the 2002 Pacific typhoon season.

- Severe Tropical Storm Matmo (2008) (T0803, 04W, Dindo) – remained out to sea.
- Typhoon Matmo (2014) (T1410, 10W, Henry) – struck Taiwan and mainland China.
- Severe Tropical Storm Matmo (2019) (T1922, 23W, BOB 04) – struck Indochina and regenerated in the Bay of Bengal as a stronger tropical cyclone.
- Typhoon Matmo (2025) (T2521, 27W, Paolo) – made landfall in Isabela, Philippines and Zhanjiang, China as a moderately strong typhoon, brought disastrous flooding to Vietnam

The name Matmo was retired following the 2025 Pacific typhoon season and a replacement name will be given at the 59th WMO/Typhoon Committee Annual Session in spring 2027.
