= An Imperial Disaster =

Nonfiction book by Benjamin Kingsbury

- Author: Benjamin Kingsbury
- Subject: 1876 Bengal cyclone
- Genre: History
- Publisher: C. Hurst & Co., Speaking Tiger Books
- Publication date: 2018

An Imperial Disaster: The Bengal Cyclone of 1876 is a work of history by the New Zealand scholar Benjamin Kingsbury. Originally formulated as the author's PhD thesis at Victoria University of Wellington in 2016, the book was published in 2018 to critical acclaim. It was published by C. Hurst & Co. in the UK and by Speaking Tiger in India. It deals with the 1876 Bengal cyclone, which was one of the worst natural disasters of the 19th century and claimed up to 300,000 lives, but is almost completely forgotten today. Kingsbury's book is the first single-volume modern work entirely dedicated to the disaster. It has been praised by South Asian scholars such as Sunil Amrith (Harvard), Chandrika Kaul (St Andrews), Nandini Gooptu (Oxford), Peter Robb (SOAS), and Rochona Majumdar (Chicago).

It has also received positive reviews in mainstream Indian papers such as The Telegraph (Calcutta) and The Sunday Guardian.
