= List of tropical cyclone records =

This is a condensed list of worldwide tropical cyclone records set by different storms and seasons.

Colour scheme used in this table:
Hydrological records
Impact records
Intensity records
Longevity records
Size records
Velocity records
Miscellaneous records

== Major records ==
Characteristic	Record	Date	Tropical Cyclone and/or Location	Ref(s)
Highest overall rainfall	6,083 mm (239.5 in)	January 14, 1980 – January 28, 1980	Cyclone Hyacinthe in Reunion Island	
Highest storm surge	14.5 m (47.6 ft)	March 5, 1899	Cyclone Mahina in Bathurst Bay, Queensland, Australia	
Highest confirmed wave height^{α}	30 m (98.4 ft)	September 11, 1995	Hurricane Luis on Queen Elizabeth 2 in the north Atlantic Ocean	
Costliest tropical cyclone	$125 billion (2005 and 2017 USD) in damages	August 29, 2005; August 25, 2017	Hurricane Katrina and Hurricane Harvey in the northern Gulf Coast of the United States	
Costliest tropical cyclone season	≥$294.803 billion (2017 USD) in damages during the 2017 Atlantic hurricane season	April 19, 2017 – November 9, 2017	North Atlantic Ocean	
Deadliest tropical cyclone	c. 500,000+ fatalities	November 12, 1970	Bhola cyclone in East Pakistan	
Deadliest tropical cyclone season	500,805+ fatalities during the 1970 North Indian Ocean cyclone season	May 2, 1970 – November 29, 1970	North Indian Ocean	
Most tornadoes formed	120 confirmed tornadoes	September 15, 2004 – September 18, 2004	Hurricane Ivan in the southern and eastern United States	
Highest wind gusts	113.4 m/s (254 mph; 220.4 kn; 408 km/h)	April 10, 1996	Cyclone Olivia in Barrow Island, Western Australia	
Highest accumulated cyclone energy (ACE) index for a tropical cyclone	85	August 24, 2006 – September 2, 2006	Hurricane/Typhoon Ioke in the northeast and northwest Pacific Ocean	
Highest accumulated cyclone energy (ACE) index for a season	570 during the 1997 Pacific typhoon season	January 19, 1997 – December 23, 1997	Northwest Pacific Ocean	
Highest number of rapid intensification cycles for a tropical cyclone	6	February 4, 2023 – March 14, 2023	Cyclone Freddy in the Australian region and South-West Indian Ocean	
Most intense (1-minute maximum sustained surface winds)^{β}	96.2 m/s (215 mph; 187.0 kn; 346 km/h)	October 23, 2015	Hurricane Patricia in the northeast Pacific Ocean	
Most intense (10-minute maximum sustained winds)	78.2 m/s (175 mph; 152.0 kn; 282 km/h)	February 20, 2016	Cyclone Winston in the south Pacific Ocean	
Most intense (lowest central pressure)	870 mb (870.0 hPa; 25.7 inHg)	October 12, 1979	Typhoon Tip in the northwest Pacific Ocean	
Most intense at landfall (1-minute maximum sustained winds)	87.2 m/s (195 mph; 169.5 kn; 314 km/h)	November 1, 2020	Typhoon Goni in Catanduanes, Philippines	
Most intense at landfall (10-minute maximum sustained winds)	78.2 m/s (175 mph; 152.0 kn; 282 km/h)	February 20, 2016	Cyclone Winston in Viti Levu, Fiji.	
Most intense at landfall (pressure)	884 mb (884.0 hPa; 26.1 inHg)	February 20, 2016	Cyclone Winston in Viti Levu, Fiji.	
Longest lasting tropical cyclone	36 days	February 4, 2023 – March 14, 2023	Cyclone Freddy in the Australian region and South-West Indian Ocean	
Longest distance traveled by a tropical cyclone	13,180 km (8,190 mi)	August 11, 1994 – September 13, 1994	Hurricane/Typhoon John in the northeast and northwest Pacific Ocean	
Longest lasting Category 4 or 5 winds	8.25 consecutive days	August 24, 2006 – September 2, 2006	Hurricane/Typhoon Ioke in the northeast and northwest Pacific Ocean	
Longest lasting Category 5 winds^{β}	5.50 consecutive days	September 9, 1961 – September 14, 1961	Typhoon Nancy in the northwest Pacific Ocean	
Largest tropical cyclone (radius of winds from center)	Gale winds 17.5 m/s (40 mph; 35 kn; 65 km/h) extending 1,086 km (675 mi) from center	October 12, 1979	Typhoon Tip in the northwest Pacific Ocean	
Smallest tropical cyclone (radius of winds from center)	Gale winds 17.5 m/s (40 mph; 35 kn; 65 km/h) extending 18.5 km (11.5 mi) from center	October 7, 2008	Tropical Storm Marco in the Bay of Campeche	
Largest eye	370 km (230 mi)	August 20, 1960; August 17, 1997	Typhoon Carmen and Typhoon Winnie in the northwest Pacific Ocean	
Smallest eye	3.7 km (2.3 mi)	October 19, 2005	Hurricane Wilma in the Caribbean Sea	
Fastest intensification (1-minute sustained surface winds)	54 m/s (120 mph; 105 kn; 195 km/h), from 38 m/s (85 mph; 75 kn; 135 km/h) to 91.6 m/s (205 mph; 180 kn; 330 km/h) in under 24 h	October 22, 2015 – October 23, 2015	Hurricane Patricia in the northeast Pacific Ocean	
Fastest intensification (pressure)	100 mb (100 hPa), from 976 mb (976.0 hPa; 28.8 inHg) to 876 mb (876.0 hPa; 25.9 inHg) in under 24 h	September 22, 1983 – September 23, 1983	Typhoon Forrest in the northwest Pacific Ocean	
Fastest seafloor current produced by a tropical cyclone	2.25 m/s (5 mph; 5 kn; 10 km/h)	September 16, 2004	Hurricane Ivan in the north Atlantic Ocean	
Fastest updraft produced in a tropical cyclone	27.4 m/s (60 mph; 55 kn; 100 km/h)	October 23, 2015	Hurricane Patricia in the northeast Pacific Ocean	
Closest proximity to the equator	1.4° N	December 26, 2001	Tropical Storm Vamei in the South China Sea	
Heaviest natural object moved by a tropical cyclone	160,572 kg (177 short tons)	November 8, 2013	Typhoon Haiyan in Samar, Philippines	
Highest number of tropical storms in a season	39 official storms during the 1964 Pacific typhoon season	May 12, 1964 – December 17, 1964	Northwest Pacific Ocean	
Warmest eye	34.0 °C (93.2 °F) at 700 hPa height	August 19, 1979	Typhoon Judy in the northwest Pacific Ocean	
Coldest cloud tops produced by a tropical cyclone	−109.35 °C (−164.83 °F)	November 30, 2019	Typhoon Kammuri over the Philippine Sea	

== See also ==
- List of weather records
  - Tornado records
- List of the most intense tropical cyclones
- List of wettest tropical cyclones
- Outline of tropical cyclones

== Notes ==
^α Although Luis produced the highest confirmed wave height for a tropical cyclone, it is possible that Hurricane Ivan produced a wave measuring 131 feet (40 m).
^β JTWC's best track has Typhoon Nancy's sustained winds as high as Hurricane Patricia's. However, the JTWC considers reconnaissance aircraft to have overestimated wind speeds in tropical cyclones from the 1940s to the 1960s, and data from this time period is unreliable.
