= 1970 Bhola cyclone =

North Indian Ocean cyclone

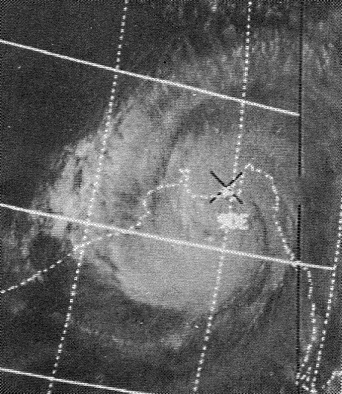
- The cyclone making landfall in East Pakistan on 12 November

Meteorological history
- Formed: 8 November 1970
- Dissipated: 13 November 1970

Extremely severe cyclonic storm
- 3-minute sustained (IMD)
- Highest winds: 185 km/h (115 mph)
- Lowest pressure: 960 hPa (mbar); 28.35 inHg

Category 4-equivalent tropical cyclone
- 1-minute sustained (SSHWS/JTWC)
- Highest winds: 240 km/h (150 mph)

Overall effects
- Fatalities: 300,000–500,000 total (Deadliest tropical cyclone on record)
- Damage: $86.4 million (1970 USD)
- Areas affected: East Pakistan; India
- Part of the 1970 North Indian Ocean cyclone season

The 1970 Bhola cyclone, also known as the Great Cyclone of 1970 or simply the Bhola Cyclone, was the deadliest tropical cyclone on record, as well as one of the deadliest humanitarian disasters ever recorded. It struck East Pakistan (present-day Bangladesh) and India's West Bengal on 12 November 1970. At least 300,000 people died in the storm, possibly as many as 500,000, primarily as a result of the storm surge that flooded much of the low-lying islands of the Ganges Delta. The Bhola cyclone was the sixth and strongest cyclonic storm of the 1970 North Indian Ocean cyclone season.

The cyclone formed over the central Bay of Bengal on 8 November and travelled northward, intensifying as it did so. It reached its peak with winds of 185 km/h (115 mph) on 10 November, and made landfall on the coast of East Pakistan on the following afternoon. The storm surge devastated many of the offshore islands, wiping out villages and destroying crops throughout the region. In the most severely affected upazila Tazumuddin, over 45% of the population of 167,000 were killed by the storm.

The Pakistani government, led by junta leader General Yahya Khan, was criticized for its delayed handling of relief operations following the storm, both by local political leaders in East Pakistan and by the international media. The poor and discriminatory response from the West Pakistan government led to the increasingly widespread disillusionment from the East Pakistani people, allowing the opposition Awami League to gain a landslide victory in the province during the election that took place a month later as well as the Bangladesh Liberation War seven months later.

== Meteorological history ==
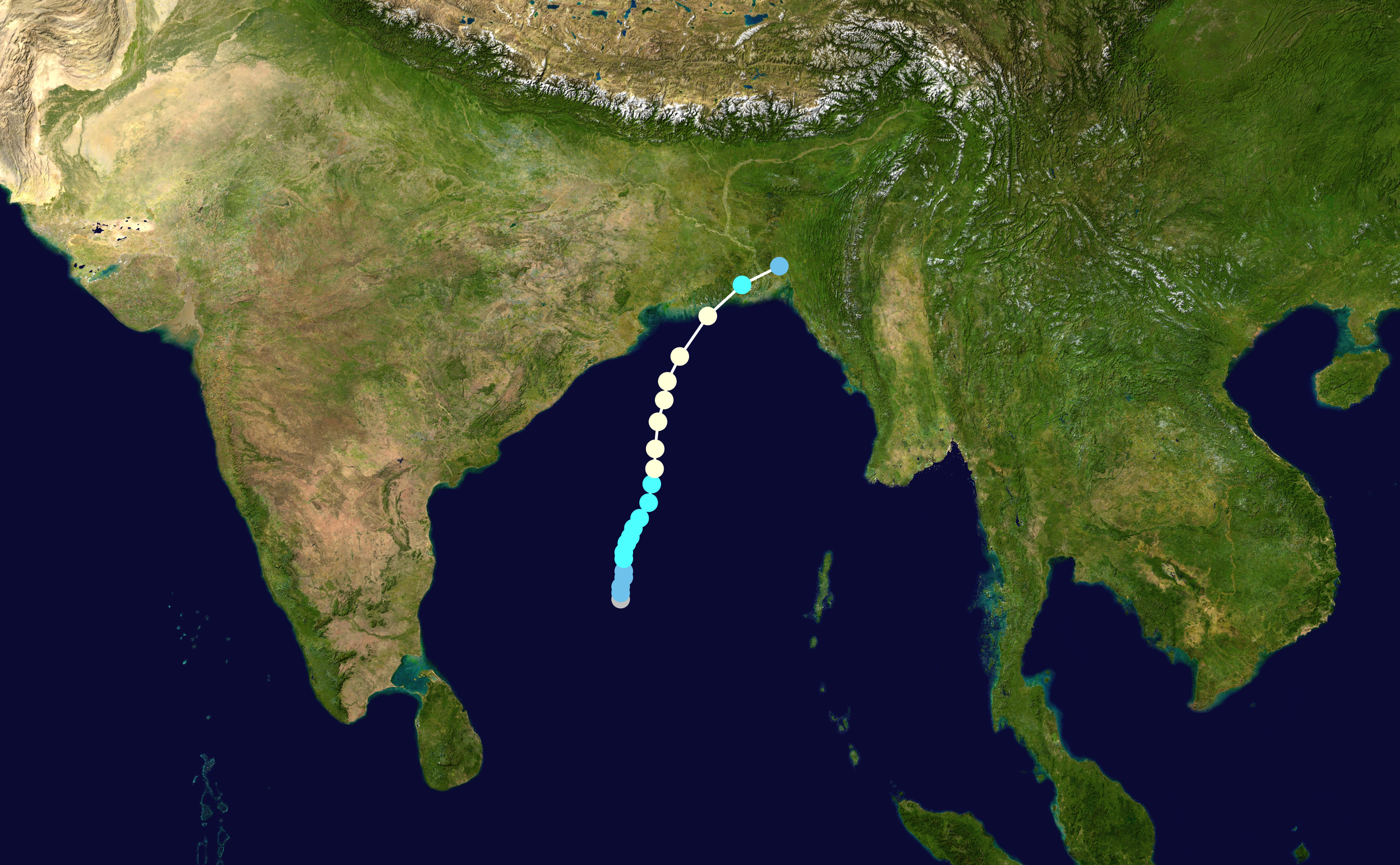
Map plotting the storm's track and intensity, according to the Saffir–Simpson scale Map key Saffir–Simpson scale Tropical depression (≤38 mph, ≤62 km/h) Tropical storm (39–73 mph, 63–118 km/h) Category 1 (74–95 mph, 119–153 km/h) Category 2 (96–110 mph, 154–177 km/h) Category 3 (111–129 mph, 178–208 km/h) Category 4 (130–156 mph, 209–251 km/h) Category 5 (≥157 mph, ≥252 km/h) Unknown Storm type Tropical cyclone Subtropical cyclone Extratropical cyclone, remnant low, tropical disturbance, or monsoon depression

On 1 November, Tropical Storm Nora developed over the South China Sea, in the West Pacific Ocean. The system lasted for four days before degenerating into a remnant low over the Gulf of Thailand on 4 November, and subsequently moved west over the Malay Peninsula the next day. The remnants of this system contributed to the development of a new depression in the central Bay of Bengal on the morning of 8 November. The depression intensified as it moved slowly northward, and the India Meteorological Department upgraded it to a cyclonic storm the next day. No country in the region had ever named tropical cyclones during this time, so no new identity was given. The storm became nearly stationary that evening near 14.5°N 87°E, but began to accelerate toward the north on 10 November.

The storm further intensified into a severe cyclonic storm on 11 November and began to turn towards the northeast as it approached the head of the bay. It developed a clear eye and reached its peak intensity later that day, with three-minute sustained winds of 185 km/h (115 mph), one-minute sustained winds of 240 km/h (150 mph), and a central pressure of 960 hPa. The cyclone made landfall on the East Pakistan coastline during the evening of 12 November, around the same time as the local high tide. Once over land, the system began to weaken; the storm degraded to a cyclonic storm on 13 November, when it was about 100 km (62 mi) south-southeast of Agartala. The storm then rapidly weakened into a remnant low over southern Assam that evening.

== Preparations ==
There are some questions as to how much of the information about the cyclone said to have been received by Indian weather authorities was transmitted to East Pakistan authorities. This is because the Indian and East Pakistani weather services may not have shared information given the Indo-Pakistani friction at the time. A large part of the population was reportedly taken by surprise by the storm. There were indications that East Pakistan's storm warning system was not used properly. The Pakistan Meteorological Department issued a report calling for "danger preparedness" in the vulnerable coastal regions during the day on 12 November. As the storm neared the coast, a "great danger signal" was broadcast on Radio Pakistan. Survivors later said that this meant little to them, but that they had recognised a No. 1 warning signal as representing the greatest possible threat.

Following two previously destructive cyclones in October 1960, which killed at least 16,000 people in East Pakistan, the Pakistani central government contacted the American government for assistance in developing a system to avert future disasters. Gordon Dunn, the director of the National Hurricane Center at the time, carried out a detailed study and submitted his report in 1961. However, the central government did not carry out all the recommendations Dunn had listed.

== Impact ==
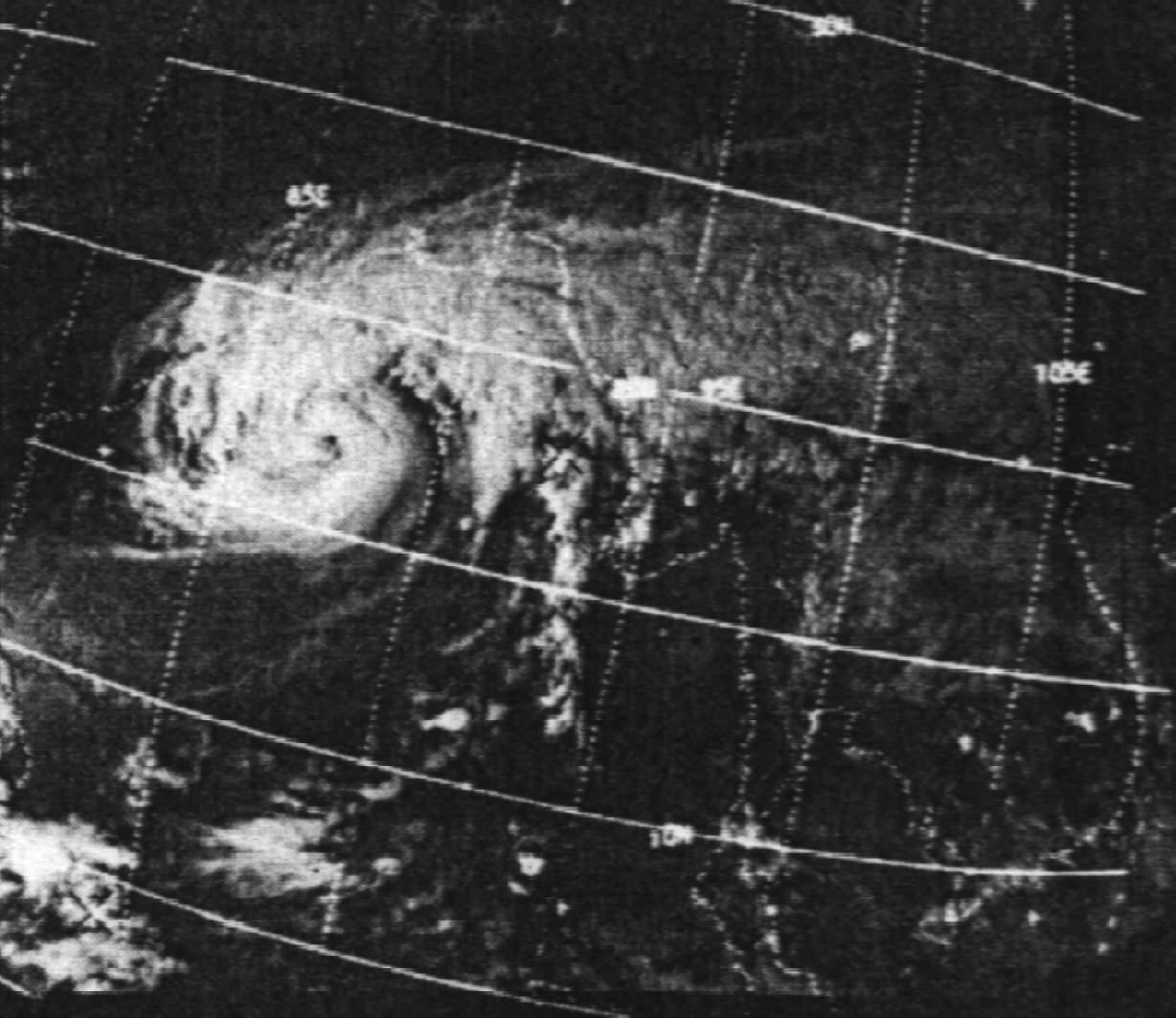
The cyclone taken on November 11.

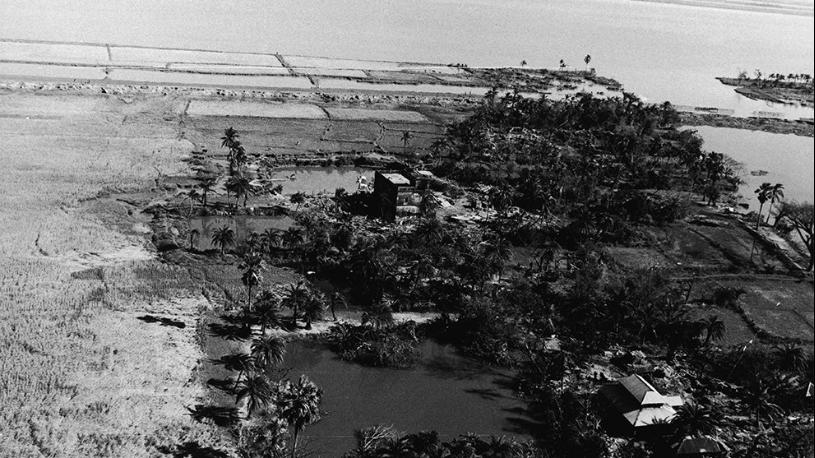
Destruction in Patuakhali after the cyclone

Although the North Indian Ocean is the least active of the tropical cyclone basins, the coast of the Bay of Bengal is particularly vulnerable to the effects of tropical cyclones. The exact death toll from the Bhola cyclone remains unknown, but at least 300,000 fatalities were associated with the storm, possibly as many as 500,000.

The Bhola cyclone is the deadliest tropical cyclone on record and also one of the deadliest natural disasters in modern history. A comparable number of people died as a result of the 1976 Tangshan earthquake, the 2004 Indian Ocean earthquake, and the 2010 Haiti earthquake, but because of uncertainty in the number of deaths in all four disasters, it may never be known which one was the deadliest.

=== Bangladesh ===
Deadliest tropical cyclones since 1900
| Rank | Name/Year | Region | Fatalities |
|---|---|---|---|
| 1 | Bhola 1970 | Bangladesh | ≥300,000 |
| 2 | Shanghai 1931 | China | 302,040 |
| 3 | Bangladesh 1991 | Bangladesh | 138,866 |
| 4 | Nargis 2008 | Myanmar | 138,373 |
| 5 | Unnamed 1911 | Bangladesh | 120,000 |
| 6 | Unnamed 1917 | Bangladesh | 70,000 |
| 7 | Harriet 1962 | Thailand, Bangladesh | 50,935 |
| 8 | Unnamed 1919 | Bangladesh | 40,000 |
| 9 | Nina 1975 | China | 26,000 |
| 10 | Unnamed 1958 | Bangladesh | 12,000 |
| 10 | Unnamed 1965 | Bangladesh | 12,000 |

The meteorological station in Chittagong, 95 km (59 mi) to the east of where the storm made landfall, recorded winds of 144 km/h (89 mph) before its anemometer was blown off at about 2200 UTC on 12 November. A ship anchored in the port in the same area recorded a peak gust of 222 km/h (138 mph) about 45 minutes later. As the storm made landfall, it caused a 10-metre (33 ft) high storm surge at the Ganges Delta. In the port at Chittagong, the storm tide peaked at about 4 m (13 ft) above the average sea level, 1.2 m (3.9 ft) of which was the storm surge.

Radio Pakistan reported that there were no survivors on the thirteen islands near Chittagong. A flight over the area showed the devastation was complete throughout the southern half of Bhola Island, and the rice crops of Bhola Island, Hatia Island and the nearby mainland coastline were destroyed. Several seagoing vessels in the ports of Chittagong and Mongla were reported damaged, and the airports at Chittagong and Cox's Bazar were under 1 m (3.3 ft) of water for several hours.

Over 3.6 million people were directly affected by the cyclone, and the total damage from the storm was estimated at US$86.4 million (US$701 million in 2024). The survivors claimed that approximately 85% of homes in the area were destroyed or severely damaged, with the greatest destruction occurring along the coast. Ninety percent of marine fishermen in the region suffered heavy losses, including the destruction of 9,000 offshore fishing boats. Of the 77,000 onshore fishermen, 46,000 were killed by the cyclone, and 40% of the survivors were affected severely. In total, approximately 65% of the fishing capacity of the coastal region was destroyed by the storm, in a region where about 80% of the protein consumed comes from fish. Agricultural damage was similarly severe with the loss of US$63 million worth of crops and 280,000 cattle. Three months after the storm, 75% of the population was receiving food from relief workers, and over 150,000 relied upon aid for half of their food.

The Bhola Cyclone would also lead to increased cholera and typhoid cases in the region due to the contamination of the water supply in the storm. Many attempts to send aid to the region were impeded by the prevalent cholera, and as a result, medical aid was delayed.

=== India ===
The cyclone brought widespread rain to the Andaman and Nicobar Islands, with very heavy rain falling in places on 8–9 November. Port Blair recorded 130 mm (5.1 in) of rain on 8 November, and there were a number of floods on the islands. MV Mahajagmitra, a 5,500-ton freighter en route from Calcutta to Kuwait, was sunk by the storm on 12 November with the loss of all fifty people on board. The ship sent out a distress signal and reported experiencing hurricane-force winds before it sank. There was also widespread rain in West Bengal and southern Assam. The rain caused damage to housing and crops in both Indian states, with the worst damage occurring in the southernmost districts.

=== Death toll ===
Two medical relief surveys were carried out by the Pakistan-SEATO Cholera Research Laboratory: the first in November and the second in February and March. The purpose of the first survey was to establish the immediate medical needs in the affected regions. The second, more detailed, survey was designed as the basis for long-term relief and recovery planning. In the second survey, approximately 1.4% of the area's population was studied.

The first survey concluded that the surface water in most of the affected regions had a comparable salt content to that drawn from wells, except in Sudharam, where the water was almost undrinkable with a salt content of up to 0.5%. The mortality was estimated at 14.2%—equivalent to a death toll of 240,000. Cyclone-related morbidity was generally restricted to minor injuries, but a phenomenon dubbed "cyclone syndrome" was observed. This consisted of severe abrasions on the limbs and chest caused by survivors clinging to trees to withstand the storm surge. Initially, there were fears of an outbreak of cholera and typhoid fever in the weeks following the storm, but the survey found no evidence of an epidemic of cholera, smallpox, or any other disease in the region affected by the storm.

The totals from the second survey were likely a considerable underestimate, as several groups were not included— 100,000 migrant workers who were collecting the rice harvest, families who were completely wiped out by the storm, and those who had migrated out of the region in the intervening three months. Excluding these groups reduced the risk of hearsay and exaggeration. The survey concluded that the overall death toll was, at minimum, 224,000. The worst effects were felt in Tazumuddin, where the mortality was 46.3%, corresponding to approximately 80,000 deaths in the thana alone. The mean mortality throughout the affected region was 16.5%.

The results showed that the highest survival rate was for adult males aged 15–49, while more than half the deaths were children under age 10, who only formed a third of the pre-cyclone population. This suggests that the young, old, and sick were at the highest risk of perishing in the cyclone and its storm surge. In the months after the storm, the mortality of the middle-aged was lower in the cyclone area than in the control region, near Dhaka. This reflected the storm's toll on the less healthy individuals.

== Aftermath ==
=== Government response ===
There have been mistakes, there have been delays, but by and large I'm very satisfied that everything is being done and will be done.

— Yahya Khan

The days after the storm struck the coast, three Pakistani gunboats and a hospital ship carrying medical personnel and supplies left Chittagong for the islands of Hatiya, Sandwip, and Kutubdia. Teams from the Pakistani Army reached many of the stricken areas in the two days following the landfall of the cyclone. President Khan visited East Pakistan on the way back from a trip to China. In a press conference in Dhaka, Khan accepted the government had made "slips" and "mistakes" in their relief effort for the cyclone victims of then East Pakistan (now Bangladesh), but he insisted that "everything was done within the limits of the Government." He then returned to Rawalpindi. No West Pakistani political leaders visited the East.

In the ten and a half days following the cyclone, one military transport aircraft and three crop-dusting aircraft were assigned to relief work by the Pakistani central government. The central government said it was unable to transfer military helicopters from West Pakistan as the Indian government did not grant clearance to cross the intervening Indian territory, a charge the Indian government denied. By 24 November, the central government had allocated a further US$116 million to finance relief operations in the disaster area. Khan arrived in Dhaka to take charge of the relief operations on 24 November. The governor of East Pakistan, Vice Admiral S. M. Ahsan, denied charges that the armed forces had not acted quickly enough and said supplies were reaching all parts of the disaster area except for some small pockets.

Khan said there was a lack of understanding of the magnitude of the disaster. He also said that the 1970 general election slated for 7 December would take place on time, although eight or nine of the worst affected districts might experience delays, denying rumours that the election would be postponed.

As the conflict between East and West Pakistan developed in March 1971, the Dhaka offices of the two government organisations directly involved in relief efforts were closed for at least two weeks, first by a general strike and then by a ban on government work in East Pakistan by the Awami League. Relief work continued in the field, but the long-term planning was curtailed.

=== Criticism of government response ===
We have a large army, but it is left to the British Marines to bury our dead.

— Sheikh Mujibur Rahman

Political leaders in East Pakistan were deeply critical of the central government's initial response to the disaster. A statement released by eleven East Pakistan politicians ten days after the storm charged the government with "gross neglect, callous indifference and utter indifference". They also accused President Khan of playing down the news coverage. On November 19, students held a march in Dhaka in protest of the speed of the government response, and Maulana Abdul Hamid Khan Bhashani addressed a rally of 50,000 people on 24 November, when he accused the president of inefficiency and demanded his resignation. Khan's political opponents in West Pakistan accused him of bungling the efforts, and some demanded his resignation. Awami League leader Bangabandhu Sheikh Mujibur Rahman described the destruction caused by the cyclone as akin to a "Holocaust" and condemned the military junta's response as "criminal negligence".

The Pakistan Red Crescent began to operate independently of the central government as the result of a dispute that arose after the Red Crescent took possession of twenty rafts donated by the British Red Cross. A pesticide company had to wait two days before it received permission for two of its crop dusters, which were already in the country, to carry out supply drops in the affected regions. The central government only deployed a single helicopter to relief operations, with Khan later stating that there was no point in deploying any helicopters from West Pakistan as they were unable to carry supplies.

A reporter for the Pakistan Observer spent a week in the worst-hit areas in early January 1971 and saw none of the tents supplied by relief agencies being used to house survivors and commented that the grants for building new houses were insufficient. The Observer regularly carried front-page stories with headlines like, "No Relief Coordination", while publishing government statements saying, "Relief operations are going smoothly." In January, the coldest period of the year in East Pakistan, the National Relief and Rehabilitation Committee, headed by the editor of Ittefaq, said thousands of survivors from the storm were "passing their days under [the] open sky". A spokesman said families who were made homeless by the cyclone were receiving up to 250 rupees (US$55 in 1971; equivalent to $341 in 2018) to rebuild, but that resources were scarce and he feared the survivors would "eat the cash".

=== Political consequences ===
Due to the poor handling and the destructive aftermath of the Bhola Cyclone, leftist parties in both East and West Pakistan boycotted the 1970 Pakistani general election. This allowed the Awami League, headed by Sheikh Mujibur Rahman, to win in a landslide victory. The elections for nine national assembly and eighteen provincial assembly seats had to be postponed until January 18 as a result of the storm.

The central government's handling of the relief efforts helped exacerbate the bitterness felt in East Pakistan, swelling the resistance movement there. Funds only slowly got through, and transport was slow in bringing supplies to the devastated regions. As tensions increased in March 1971, foreign personnel evacuated because of fears of violence. The situation deteriorated further and evolved into the subsequent genocide.

=== International response ===
India became one of the first nations to offer aid to Pakistan, despite the generally poor relations between the two countries, and by the end of November had pledged US$1.3 million ($11 million in 2025) of assistance for the relief efforts. The Pakistani central government refused to allow the Indians to send supplies into East Pakistan by air, forcing them to be transported slowly by road instead. The Indian government also said that the Pakistanis refused an offer of military aircraft, helicopters, and boats from West Bengal to assist in the relief operation.

U.S. President Richard Nixon allocated a $10 million ($83 million in 2025) grant to provide food and other essential relief to the survivors of the storm, and the U.S. ambassador to Pakistan pledged that he would "assist the East Pakistan government in every way feasible." The U.S. sent a number of blankets, tents and other supplies to East Pakistan. Six helicopters – two at an aid mission in Nepal and four from the U.S. – were also sent. Some 200,000 tons of wheat were shipped from the U.S. to the stricken region. By the end of November, there were 38 helicopters operating in the disaster area, ten of which were British and ten American. The Americans had provided about fifty small boats and the British seventy for supply distribution.

CARE halted aid shipments to East Pakistan the week after the cyclone hit because of unwillingness to let the Pakistani central government handle distribution. However, by January 1971, they had reached an agreement to construct 24,000 cement brick houses at a cost of about $1.2 million ($10 million in 2025). American concerns about delays by the central government in determining how the relief should be used meant that US$7.5 million ($62 million in 2025) of relief granted by the United States Congress had not been handed over in March. Much of the money was earmarked to be spent on constructing cyclone shelters and rebuilding housing. The American Peace Corps offered to send volunteers but was rebuffed by the central government.

A Royal Navy task force, centred on HMS Intrepid and HMS Triumph, left Singapore for the Bay of Bengal to assist with the relief efforts. They carried eight helicopters and eight landing craft, as well as rescue teams and supplies. Fifty soldiers and two helicopters were flown in ahead of the ships to survey the disaster area and bring relief work. The task force arrived off the East Pakistan coast on 24 November, and the 650 troops aboard the ships immediately began using landing craft to deliver supplies to offshore islands. An appeal by the British Disasters Emergency Committee raised about £1.5 million (£21 million in 2025) for disaster relief in East Pakistan.

The Canadian government pledged C$2 million (C$16 million in 2025) of assistance. France and West Germany both sent helicopters and various supplies worth US$1.3 million. Pope Paul VI announced that he would visit Dhaka during a visit to the Far East and urged people to pray for the victims of the disaster. The Vatican later contributed US$100,000 to the relief efforts. By the start of 1971, four Soviet helicopters were still operating in the region transporting essential supplies to hard-hit areas. The Soviet aircraft, which had drawn criticism from Bengalis, replaced the British and American helicopters that had operated immediately after the cyclone.

The government of Singapore sent a military medical mission to East Pakistan which arrived at Chittagong on 1 December. They were then deployed to Sandwip where they treated nearly 27,000 people and carried out a smallpox vaccination effort. The mission returned to Singapore on 22 December, after bringing about $50,000 worth of medical supplies and fifteen tons of food for the victims of the storm. The Japanese cabinet approved a total of US$1.65 million of relief funds in December. The Japanese government had previously drawn criticism for only donating a small amount to relief work. The first shipment of Chinese supplies was a planeload of 500,000 doses of cholera vaccine, which was not necessary as the country had adequate stocks. The Chinese government sent US$1.2 million in cash to Pakistan. Mohammad Reza Pahlavi declared that the disaster was also an Iranian one and responded by sending two planeloads of supplies within a few days of the cyclone striking. Many smaller, poorer Asian nations sent nominal amounts of aid.

The United Nations donated US$2.1 million in food and cash, while UNICEF began a drive to raise a further million. UNICEF helped to re-establish water supplies in the wake of the storm, repairing over 11,000 wells in the months following the storm. UN Secretary-General U Thant made appeals for aid for the victims of the cyclone and the civil war in August, in two separate relief programs. He said only about $4 million had been contributed towards immediate needs, well short of the target of US$29.2 million. By the end of November, the League of Red Cross Societies had collected US$3.5 million to supply aid to the victims of the disaster.

The World Bank estimated that it would cost US$185 million to reconstruct the area devastated by the storm. The bank drew up a comprehensive recovery plan for the Pakistani government. The plan included restoring housing, water supplies and infrastructure to their pre-storm state. It was designed to combine with a much larger ongoing flood-control and development program. The bank provided US$25 million of credit to help rebuild the East Pakistan economy and to construct protective shelters in the region. This was the first time that the IDA had provided credit for reconstruction. By the start of December, nearly US$40 million had been raised for the relief efforts by the governments of 41 countries, organizations and private groups.

==== The Concert for Bangladesh ====
In 1971, ex-Beatle George Harrison and musician Ravi Shankar were inspired to organize The Concert for Bangladesh, in part from the Bhola cyclone, and from the civil war and genocide. Although it was the first benefit concert of its type, it was extremely successful in raising money, aid, and awareness for the region's plight.

=== Post-disaster ===
In December 1970, the League of Red Cross Societies drafted a plan for immediate use should a comparable event to the cyclone hit other "disaster prone countries". A Red Cross official stated some of the relief workers sent to East Pakistan were poorly trained, and the organisation would compile a list of specialists. The UN General Assembly adopted a proposal to improve its ability to provide aid to disaster-stricken countries.

In 1966, the Red Crescent had begun to support the development of a cyclone warning system, which developed into a Cyclone Preparedness Programme in 1972, today run by the government of Bangladesh and the Bangladesh Red Crescent Society. The programme's objectives are to raise public awareness of the risks of cyclones and to provide training to emergency personnel in the coastal regions of Bangladesh.

In the thirty years after the 1970 cyclone, over 200 cyclone shelters were constructed in the coastal regions of Bangladesh. When the next destructive cyclone approached the country in 1991, volunteers from the Cyclone Preparedness Programme warned people of the cyclone two to three days before it struck land. Over 350,000 people fled their homes to shelters and other brick structures, while others sought high ground. While the 1991 cyclone killed over 138,000 people, this was significantly less than the 1970 storm, partly because of the warnings sent out by the Cyclone Preparedness Programme. However, the 1991 storm was significantly more destructive, causing US$1.5 billion (equivalent to $3.2 billion in 2025) compared to the 1970 storm's $86 million (equivalent to $551.95 million in 2025).

Footage of the incident appeared in the film Days of Fury (1979), directed by Fred Warshofsky and hosted by Vincent Price.

== In books ==
The Vortex by Scott Carney and Jason Miklian focused on how Yayhia Khan's failure to respond to the aftermath of the Bhola cyclone sparked the 1971 Bangladesh war.

== See also ==
- List of Bangladesh tropical cyclones
- List of tropical cyclone records
- 1991 Bangladesh cyclone
- New Moor – Landmass that appeared in the aftermath of the cyclone in the Bay of Bengal
