= List of extremely severe cyclonic storms =

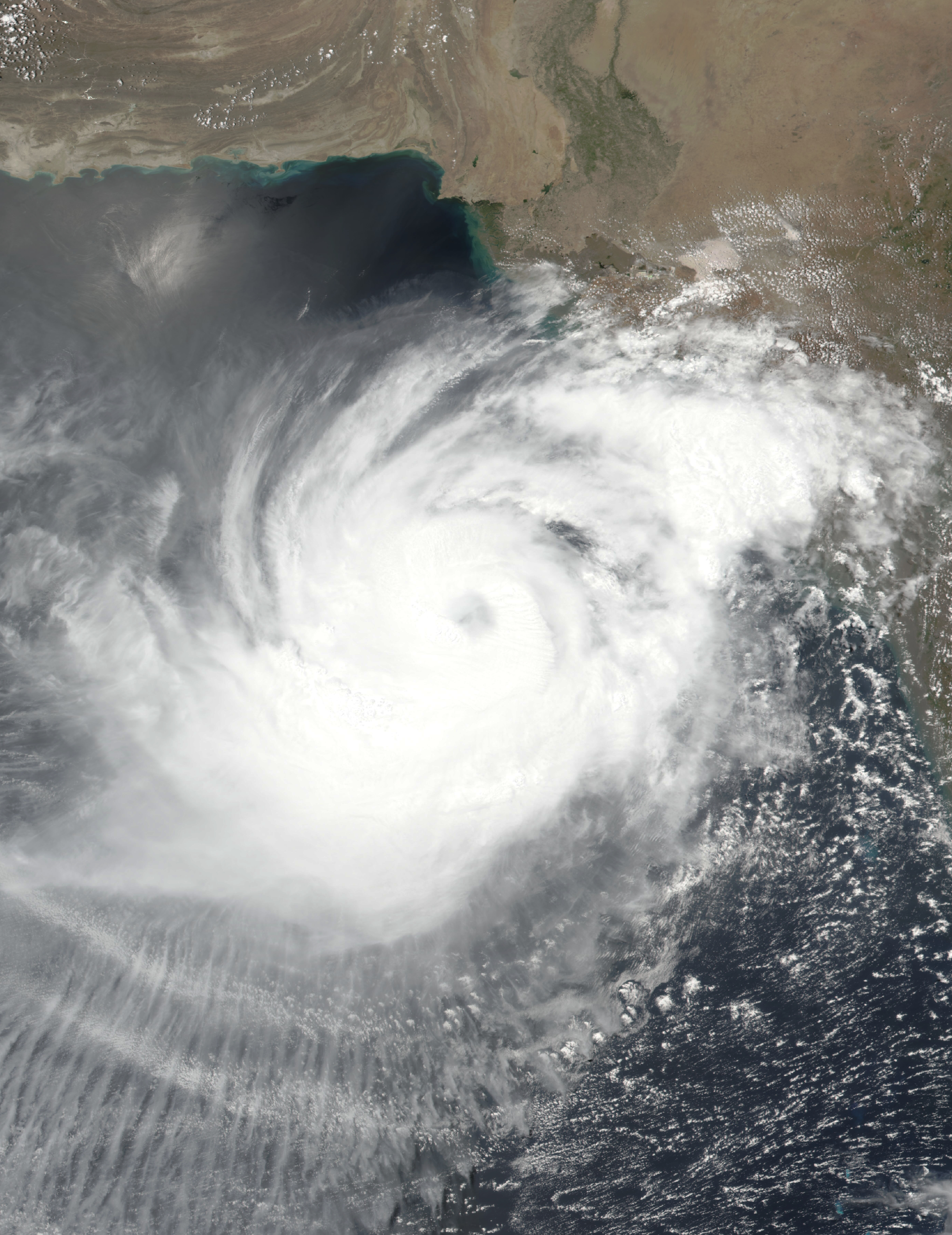
Cyclone Biparjoy, at peak intensity while approaching the India-Pakistan border region on June 12, 2023

Behind super cyclonic storms, extremely severe cyclonic storms are the second-highest classification on the India Meteorological Department (IMD)'s intensity scale. There have been 32 of them since reliable records began in 1960. The most recent extremely severe cyclonic storm was Cyclone Biparjoy of the 2023 North Indian Ocean cyclone season.

== Background ==
The North Indian Ocean tropical cyclone basin is located to the north of the Equator, and encompasses the Bay of Bengal and the Arabian Sea, between the Malay Peninsula and the Arabian Peninsula. The basin is officially monitored by the India Meteorological Department's Regional Specialized Meteorological Centre in New Delhi. Within the basin, an extremely severe cyclonic storm is defined as a tropical cyclone that has 3-minute mean maximum sustained wind speeds between 90–119 knots (165–220 km/h; 105–135 mph).

== Systems ==
Name	Dates as a tropical cyclone	Sustained wind speeds	Pressure	Areas affected	Deaths	Damage (USD)	Refs
Two	May 18 – 29, 1963	195 km/h (120 mph)	947 hPa (27.96 inHg)	No land areas	0	None	
Unnamed	November 1 – 11, 1966	205 km/h (125 mph)	961 hPa (28.38 inHg)				
Unnamed	October 21 – 28, 1968	195 km/h (120 mph)	964 hPa (28.47 inHg)				
Unnamed	November 7 – 8, 1969	165 km/h (105 mph)	975 hPa (28.79 inHg)	Andrah Pradesh	200		
Bhola	November 8 – 13, 1970	185 km/h (115 mph)	966 hPa (28.53 inHg)	India, Bangladesh	300000		
Unnamed	October 29 – 30, 1971	185 km/h (115 mph)	967 hPa (28.56 inHg)				
Unnamed	September 8 – 9, 1972	205 km/h (125 mph)	957 hPa (28.26 inHg)				
Unnamed	September 21 – 22, 1972	185 km/h (115 mph)	963 hPa (28.44 inHg)				
Unnamed	October 21 – 23, 1975	185 km/h (115 mph)	967 hPa (28.56 inHg)				
Unnamed	June 9 – 13, 1977	165 km/h (105 mph)	964 hPa (28.47 inHg)				
Unnamed	November 17 – 18, 1977	165 km/h (105 mph)	974 hPa (28.76 inHg)				
Unnamed	November 8 – 9, 1978	205 km/h (125 mph)	940 hPa (27.76 inHg)				
Unnamed	May 11 – 12, 1979	205 km/h (125 mph)	936 hPa (27.64 inHg)				
BOB 01	May 3 – 5, 1982	215 km/h (130 mph)	Not Specified	Myanmar	5	Moderate	
BOB 02	June 3, 1982	165 km/h (105 mph)	952 hPa (28.11 inHg)				
ARB 15	November 8, 1982	165 km/h (105 mph)	962 hPa (28.41 inHg)	India	341	Unknown	
BOB 06	November 8 – 9, 1983	165 km/h (105 mph)	Not Specified				
BOB 05	November 12 – 14, 1984	215 km/h (130 mph)	Not Specified	India	≥430	Moderate	
BOB 06	November 30 – December 1, 1984	215 km/h (130 mph)	973 hPa (28.73 inHg)	India, Somalia	0	Unknown	
BOB 07	November 17, 1988	205 km/h (125 mph)	Not Specified				
"Bangladesh"	November 25 – 29, 1988	215 km/h (130 mph)	955 hPa (28.20 inHg)	Bangladesh, India	6,240	$13 million	
Forrest	November 15 – 22, 1992	185 km/h (115 mph)	952 hPa (28.11 inHg)	Bangladesh, Myanmar	2	Unknown	
BOB 02	December 1 – 4, 1993	165 km/h (105 mph)	968 hPa (28.59 inHg)	India	70	$216 million	
"Bangladesh"	April 26 – May 2, 1994	215 km/h (130 mph)	940 hPa (27.76 inHg)	Bangladesh, Myanmar	350	$125 million	
BOB 07	November 21 – 25, 1995	190 km/h (115 mph)	956 hPa (28.23 inHg)	Sumatra, Myanmar, Bangladesh	172	Unknown	
"Bangladesh"	May 14 – 20, 1997	165 km/h (105 mph)	964 hPa (28.47 inHg)	Bangladesh	1,146–1296	Significant	
"Gujarat"	June 13 – 15, 1998	165 km/h (105 mph)	958 hPa (28.29 inHg)	India	4,000–10,000	$3 billion	
"Pakistan"	May 16 – 22, 1999	195 km/h (120 mph)	946 hPa (27.94 inHg)	Pakistan	700	$6 million	
BOB 05	October 15 – 19, 1999	165 km/h (105 mph)	968 hPa (28.59 inHg)	India	>80	Unknown	
BOB 05	November 26 – 30, 2000	190 km/h (115 mph)	958 hPa (28.29 inHg)	West India, Somalia	12	>$12 million	
"Sri Lanka"	December 23 – 28, 2000	165 km/h (105 mph)	970 hPa (28.64 inHg)	Sri Lanka, India	9	Minimal	
"India"	May 21 – 28, 2001	215 km/h (130 mph)	932 hPa (27.52 inHg)	Western India, Myanmar, Andaman Islands	900	Minimal	
"Myanmar"	May 16 – 19, 2004	165 km/h (105 mph)	952 hPa (28.11 inHg)	Myanmar	236	$99.2 million	
Mala	April 24 – 30, 2006	185 km/h (115 mph)	954 hPa (28.17 inHg)	Andaman Islands, Myanmar, Thailand	37	$6.7 million	
Sidr	November 11 – 16, 2007	215 km/h (130 mph)	944 hPa (27.88 inHg)	Bangladesh, West Bengal, Northeast India	15,000	$2.21 billion	
Nargis	April 27 – May 3, 2008	165 km/h (105 mph)	962 hPa (28.41 inHg)	Andaman Islands, Nicobar Islands, Bangladesh, Myanmar, Thailand, Laos, Yunnan	138 373	$12.9 billion	
Giri	October 20 – 23, 2010	195 km/h (120 mph)	950 hPa (28.05 inHg)	Bangladesh, Myanmar, Thailand, Yunnan	157	$359 million	
Phailin	October 8 – 14, 2013	215 km/h (130 mph)	940 hPa (27.76 inHg)	Malay Peninsula, Andaman Islands, Nicobar Islands, India, Myanmar, Nepal	45	$4.26 billion	
Hudhud	October 7 – 14, 2014	185 km/h (115 mph)	950 hPa (28.05 inHg)	Andaman Islands, Nicobar Islands, India, Nepal	124	$3.58 billion	
Nilofar	October 28 – 29, 2014	205 km/h (125 mph)	950 hPa (28.05 inHg)	India, Pakistan	0	Minor	
Chapala	October 30 – November 2, 2015	215 km/h (130 mph)	940 hPa (27.76 inHg)	Oman, Somalia, Yemen	9	$100 million	
Megh	November 8, 2015	175 km/h (110 mph)	964 hPa (28.47 inHg)	Oman, Somalia, Yemen	18	Unknown	
Mekunu	May 25, 2018	175 km/h (110 mph)	960 hPa (28.35 inHg)	Yemen, Oman, Saudi Arabia	26	$1.5 billion	
Fani	April 30 – May 3, 2019	215 km/h (130 mph)	932 hPa (27.52 inHg)	Sumatra, Nicobar Islands, Sri Lanka, India, Bangladesh, Bhutan	89	$8.1 billion	
Maha	October 30 – November 7, 2019	185 km/h (115 mph)	956 hPa (28.23 inHg)	Sri Lanka, Southern India, Maldives, Western India, Oman	0	Minor	
Tauktae	May 14 – 19, 2021	195 km/h (120 mph)	950 hPa (28.05 inHg)	Maldives, India, Pakistan	174	$1.57 billion	
Mocha	May 9 –15, 2023	215 km/h (130 mph)	938 hPa (27.70 inHg)	Bangladesh, Myanmar	463	$1.5 billion	
Biparjoy	June 6 – 19, 2023	165 km/h (105 mph)	958 hPa (28.29 inHg)	India, Pakistan	17		

== Climatology ==
Extremely severe cyclonic storms by month.
Month	Number of storms
January	0
February	0
March	0
April	4
May	8
June	3
July	0
August	0
September	2
October	9
November	15
December	2

Extremely severe cyclonic storms by decade.
Decade	Number of storms
1960s	2
1970s	8
1980s	8
1990s	8
2000s	7
2010s	8
2020s	1

== See also ==
- North Indian Ocean tropical cyclone
