= 1968 Burma cyclone =

1968 tropical cyclone

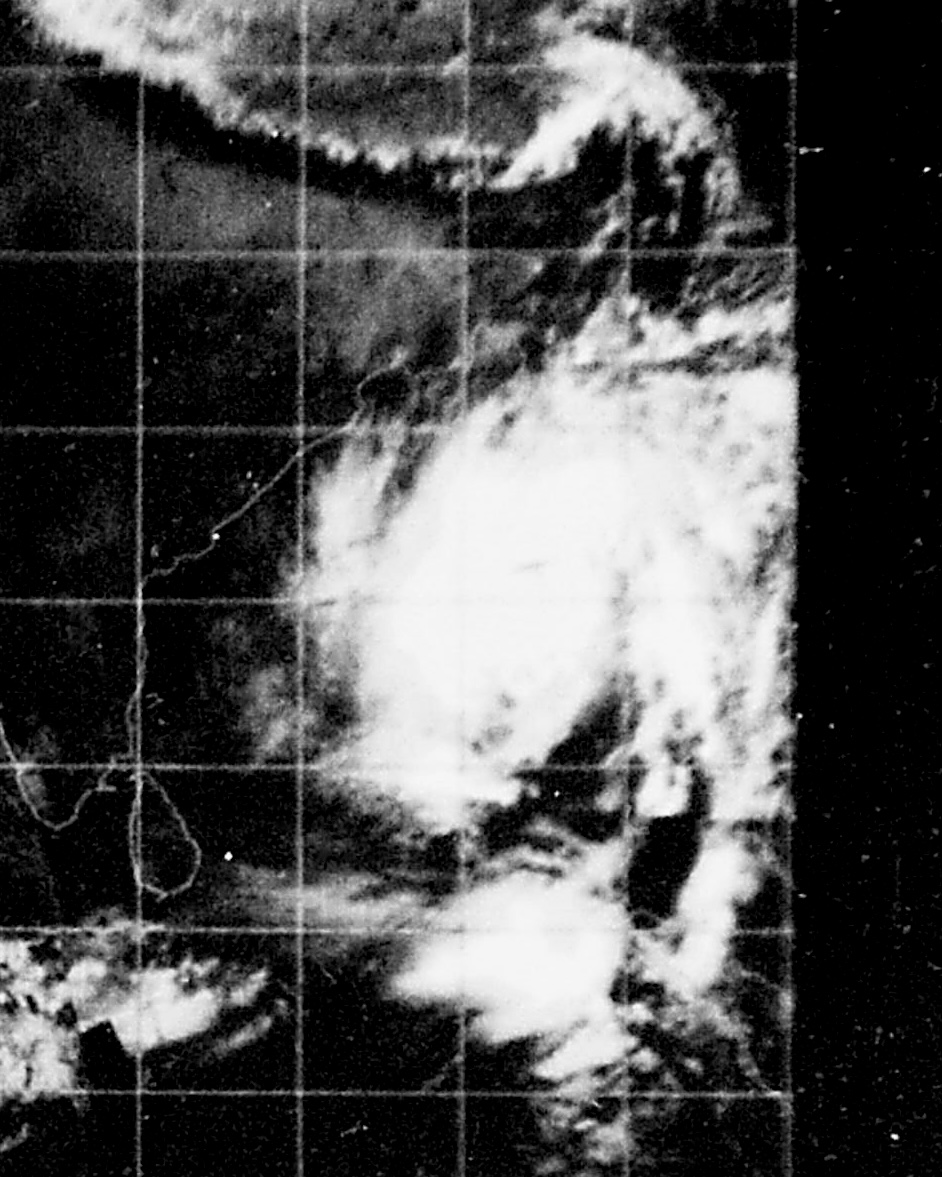
- Satellite image of the cyclone on May 8

Meteorological history
- Formed: May 7, 1968
- Dissipated: May 10, 1968

Super cyclonic storm
- 3-minute sustained (IMD)
- Highest winds: 220 km/h (140 mph)
- Lowest pressure: 953 hPa (mbar); 28.14 inHg

Category 1-equivalent tropical cyclone
- 1-minute sustained (SSHWS/JTWC)
- Highest winds: 120 km/h (75 mph)

Overall effects
- Fatalities: 1,049 reported
- Missing: 2,000
- Damage: $3.27 million (1968 USD)
- Areas affected: Andaman and Nicobar Islands, Burma (now Myanmar)
- Part of the 1968 North Indian Ocean cyclone season

The 1968 Burma cyclone was regarded as the worst to strike the country of Myanmar during the 20th century before it was surpassed by another unnamed cyclone in 2004 and further, Cyclone Nargis in 2008, respectively. The first tropical cyclone of the 1968 North Indian Ocean cyclone season, it started as a depression on May 7 on the northern Andaman Sea. With low wind shear and warm sea surface temperatures, the storm intensified in the waters near Burma before heading northwestwards. It then started to rapidly intensify, with an eye becoming apparent on satellite imagery on May 9. Also that day, it reached its peak intensity, with 3-minute maximum sustained winds of 220 km/h (140 mph) by the Indian Meteorological Department, which is equivalent to a super cyclonic storm; however, the agency treated the system as a severe cyclonic storm. Little to no changes happened on the cyclone as it turned northeastwards, making landfall near Akyab (now Sittwe) between 18:00 and 21:00 UTC on that day. Land interaction rapidly weakened the storm, dissipating on May 10 as an area of low-pressure in south Chin State.

The predecessor to the cyclone caused light to moderate downpour to the Andaman Islands; however, no deaths were reported. Winds reported from the cyclone inland Burma reached an estimate of 60–100 mph, altogether with heavy rainfall and large storm surges. The former flooded the crops, submerging them in floodwaters in the process while the latter washed out villages near the path of the storm. Schools and hospitals throughout Akyab were destroyed by high winds and large waves, while the port suffered major damages. The town was almost destroyed due to the storm. In addition, some ships in the said harbor, including the Greek freighter Geros Michalos were reportedly sunk in the Bay of Bengal. Houses were destroyed during the storm and many livestock died, mainly due to drowning. The death toll from the cyclone was finalized in May 1968 at 1,037 individuals, while 2,000 more were reportedly missing. The property damages were estimated at Ks.15 million ($3.248 million USD).

After the cyclone, the Government of Burma started to release aid to the victims, altogether with food supplies and cotton blankets. The Red Cross Society of the country donated cases of medicines to the country, while the United States Government released over 25,000 blankets to be transferred to the area. In addition, many countries and organizations including the UNICEF contributed over $121,291 (1968 USD) to Myanmar, following the disaster.

== Meteorological history ==
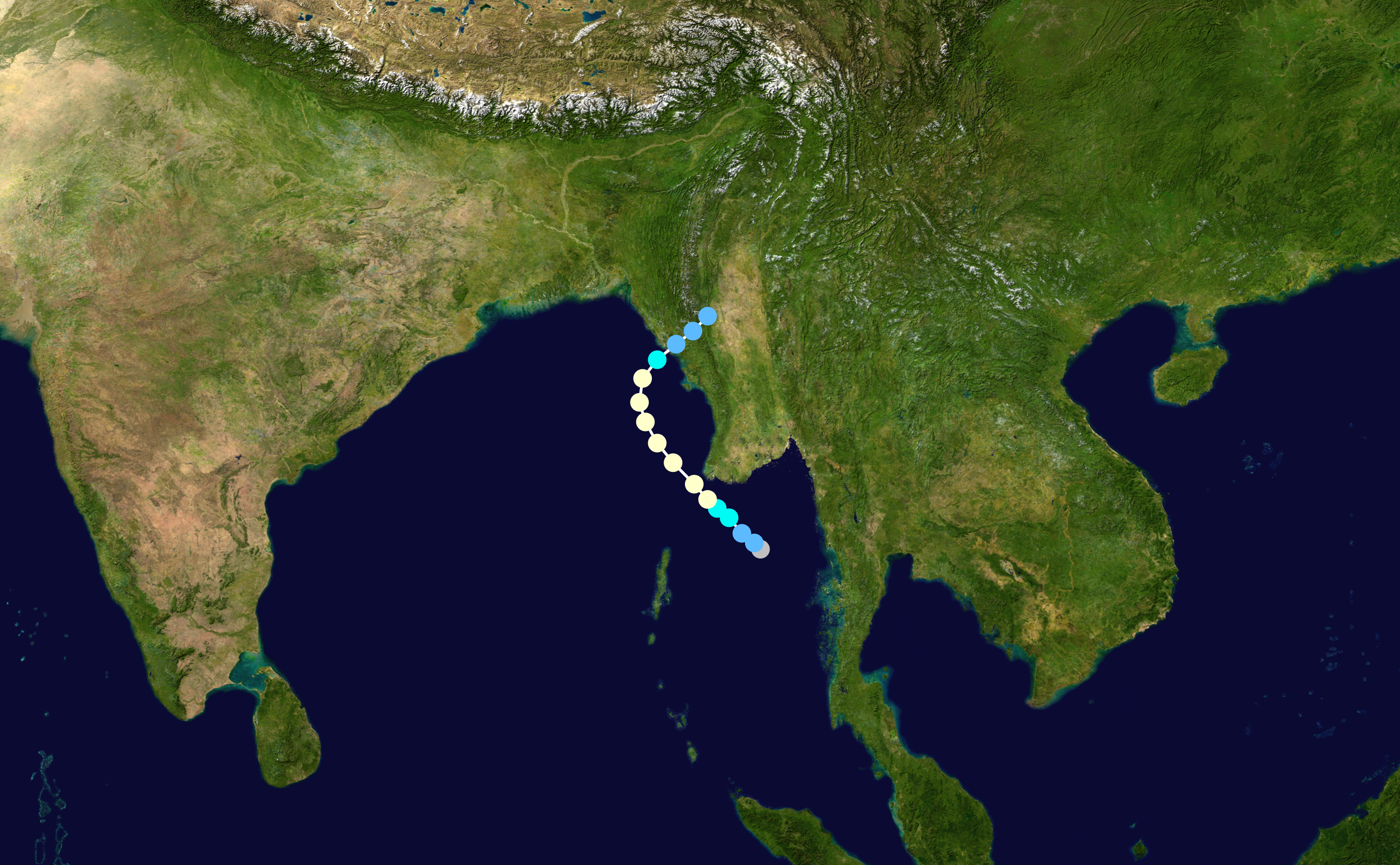
The track of the 1968 Burma cyclone using IBTrACS data.

On May 5, a weak cyclonic circulation, which likely emerged from the Andaman Sea started to move westwards across the southern portion of Burma. The convection of thunderstorms started to consolidate at that time, as pressure countings along the southern coasts of Arakan and Tenasserim regions started to fall, all in the country. In addition, on that day, a trough of low pressure formed along the circulation in the northern Andaman Sea, which would later spawn a well-marked disturbance, early the next day. At 18:00 UTC that day, the disturbance intensified to a depression and further to a deep depression on the next day as it located in a favorable environment for intensification, as evidenced by the rapid strengthening state of the system. The IMD upgraded the system to a cyclonic storm at 18:00 UTC that day before further intensifying to a severe cyclonic storm on the next day as it moved northwestwards. The storm had an eye feature and a well-defined central dense overcast as being evidenced by satellite imagery. The cyclone then started to move west-northwestwards before turning north as the motion of the system slowed down. On May 9, a ESSA-6 satellite image of the cyclone showed that the system became more compact in size, and its eye became more apparent. Shortly after, the IMD assessed the system to be at a peak intensity of 220 km/h (140 mph) in 3-minute means, well equivalent to a super cyclonic storm on the intensity scale by the agency; however, it was treated as a severe cyclonic storm in the department's record and report on the storm. Using the Davidon–Fletcher–Powell formula on the minimum barometric pressure on the system, it was analyzed to be at 953 mbar (28.1 inHg), the lowest recorded in association with the system. Little no changes happened in the intensity of the system as it started to recurve northeastwards, approaching western Burma. Between 21:00 and 00:00 UTC on that day and the following, the cyclone crossed the northern coast of Arakan near Akyab, with the latter suffering a direct hit from the storm. Interaction with the landmass of the country rapidly weakened the storm, becoming a well-marked area of low pressure on May 10 on southern Chin State.

== Impact ==
The predecessor of the system influenced the monsoonal winds over the Andaman Sea and southern portions of the Bay of Bengal, causing heavy rainfall to the Andaman Islands, particularly the Napier Bay Islands, starting on May 5 until May 8. A rainfall amount of 7 cm and 6 cm was recorded in Long Island on May 5 and 7, while Port Blair on May 5, 6 and 7 reported a rain accumulation of 4, 8, and 7 cm, respectively. In the Middle Andaman Island of Maya Bandar, a rain amount of 7 cm was also recorded, while Hut Bay reported the same on May 7. No damages and deaths were reported.

=== Burma ===
Death toll from different towns and townships
Akyab	16
Pauktaw	553
Minbya	39
Myebon	415
Myoe Haung	1
Rathedaung	5
Ponnagyun	8
Total	1,037

The damage from the cyclone was heaviest in Burma, where the storm caused winds over 100–150 mph (160–240 km/h) in Akyab. Though no rain accumulation reports were received from the country, massive storm surges buffeted houses and ships near the coast and on the path of the cyclone, submerging them. Nine townships in the country reported significant damages while the death toll from the cyclone mainly came from Akyab and Kyaukphyu because of the proximity to the cyclone's track. The former was 90% damaged due to the storm, with an estimated 50,000 individuals being rendered homeless out of the population of over 75,000.

The storm destroyed over 57,660 houses in the country alone, rendering 297,768 individuals homeless. Government buildings throughout Arakan suffered damages, and hospitals were left completely wrecked due to the strong winds. The port was also devastated by numerous storm surges, causing many ships to sink. The Greek freighter SS Gero Michalos sank altogether with three Burmese passenger ships on May 10 due to the gusty wind sand rough seas, with the former causing $2 million in losses. Rice mills and miscellaneous factories in Akyab were reported to be damaged, while schools were either wrecked by storm surge or devastated. Coconut trees were also downed due to strong winds. Over 17,527 livestock were killed, while 145,144 acres of paddy fields were submerged in floodwaters, all due to the storm. The large death toll from the storm is possibly due to the little information of the people inland from the cyclone. Despite this, over 12,409 people were evacuated to twelve camps that were donated by the United States of America after a cyclone that also devastated the area, nearly a year later.

Some newspapers described the wide swath of the cyclone as the worst to affect Burma until it was surpassed by another unnamed cyclone in 2004 and further, Cyclone Nargis in 2008. Damages totaled Ks.15 million ($3.169 million USD). (Note: The damage was originally reported in 2004 Myanmar kyat. Conversion provided by the Oanda Corporation.) The official death tally from the storm was at 1,037 with an estimated 2,000 more missing. The majority of fatalities were from Pauktaw and Myebon Townships with 553 and 415 deaths, respectively.

== Aftermath ==
=== Within Burma ===
After the cyclone's havoc on the country, immediate relief operations were started for the evacuees in different shelters across Burma. A high-level relief committee was built by Tin U as commander, the main leader, and secretary, which includes Lwin Maung as the relief minister and one of the secretaries and Nyunt Swe as joint-secretary to discuss the aftermath of the cyclone and preparations of relief aid to the country's victims. In Rangoon, another relief council was formed by U to assess the damages on the area, while a coordinating body was developed by Kyaw Soe on an unknown date for the same reasons.

The Burmese Red Cross made an appeal to the International Committee of the Red Cross for aid due to the storm's wide swath of damages on the country. The latter requested the help of other societies in different countries to help the country.

The government of the country immediately released Ks.2.250 million for disaster response. On May 14, the relief committee including the President and Secretary of the country's Red Cross flew from then-country's capital to Akyab, doing an on-the-spot assessment of the damages caused by the cyclone. Together on the flight was a thousand pieces of cotton blankets, 2,500 yards of longcloth, 100 cases of condensed milk, 200 dozens of baby food, and five cases of different medicines from the Burmese Red Cross and many tents from the relief committee for the evacuees. The Blind Monk of a blind school in Burma donated Ks.500/- ($105.65) from his own money, while the students of the said school contributed Ks.100/- ($21.13) to the Red Cross. In addition, many employees in factories and offices including railway stations and other places also pledged money for the victims of the storm by doing overtime in their jobs.

Three months after the cyclone, a continued flow of relief aid was sent by air and sea transportations to different shelters through the affected areas by the storm for distribution. The United States Agency for International Development (USAID) reacted to the country's reaction from the aftermath of the storm as "swift and effective".

=== Other countries' reaction to the disaster ===
Donations of other countries to Burma, following the cyclone
Country/Organization	Contribution	Date received
Swedish Red Cross	check worth $1,930 and 47,000 yards of cloth	May 21 and July 11, 1968
Canadian Red Cross	cash and clothing worth $9,061, 1,410 cases of condensed milk and 30 bundle of cloth	May 21 and 26 and July 11, 1968
East Germany	medicines worth $2,535	May 21, 1968
Indonesians in Cairo	check worth $1,155	May 23, 1968
The Trade Promotion Office of Yugoslavia in Burma	cash worth $2,113	May 24, 1968
Ambassador and Staffs of Indonesia	cash worth $2,113	May 26, 1968
Danish Red Cross	clothing and plastic cups worth $1,901	May 26, 1968
USSR Red Cross	150 cartons of sugar worth $6,761	May 30, 1968
Ambassadors and Staffs of India	cash worth $211	May 30, 1968
Bulgarian Red Cross	relief goods worth $4,226	June 2, 1968
United Nations Children's Emergency Fund	skimmed milk and clothing, made in India worth $2,000	June 5, 1968
Australia	1,040 cases of condensed milk worth $22,482	June 6, 1968
Australian Red Cross	check worth $1,124	June 6, 1968
People's Republic of China's Red Cross	check worth $4,044	June 9, 1968
United Kingdom	cash worth $5,493	June 13, 1968
Two corporations in Singapore	check worth $653	June 14, 1968
Federal Republic of Germany	medicines worth $6,399	June 15, 1968
the country of Canada	foods, medicines, drugs, clothing and tents worth $9,248	June 16, 1968
Singapore Red Cross	64,800 tins of condensed milk and 223 tons of longyis	June 27, 1968
German Red Cross	medicines worth $22,877	June 27, 1968
Japanese embassy	check worth $4,999	June 28, 1968
Hungarian Red Cross	medicines and clothing worth $5,282	July 12, 1968
London Rotary Club	blankets, bedsheets, towels, shoes and pillows	July 25, 1968
Sri Lanka embassy	1,000 pounds of tea	July 30, 1968
Pakistan embassy	textiles worth $1,056	July 30, 1968
Thai embassy	8 tons of iron sheets, 4 boxes of nails, 111 cases of condensed milk, 1,308 pieces of iron sheets worth $4,994	August 30, 1968
	$121,291 worth of donations	

On May 13, the Disaster Relief Officer of the United States received a request for more supply of blankets from Burma about the cyclone's large destruction on the area, with the committee passing the plea to the main headquarters at Washington D.C., which was further approved. As the Burmese Red Cross made an appeal for aid following the cyclone, the American Red Cross quickly acknowledged this by donating Sulfa drugs, worth $2 million. The blankets, on the other hand, were transferred to Burma from the U.S by a chartered cargo ship including $137,488 worth of disaster relief. Out of the aid, $9,000 was used for purchasing Indian cotton materials for more blankets. 25,000 more bedclothes were donated by the country's government from Boston, Massachusetts to the affected country on May 18, being given full coverage worldwide.

The Government of India donated over 6,400 longyis and 18,000 metres of long cloth from Calcutta which was received by Burma on June 1 and 3. The government also permitted the United States administration to purchase the latter donation from American-owned rupees.

Days and months after the cyclone's havoc, many agencies and humanitarian organizations, including the UNICEF donated supplies and food to Burma. The contributions totaled $121,291, which are used for the victims of the storm.

== See also ==
- 2004 Myanmar cyclone
- Cyclone Nargis
- Cyclone Mora
- Cyclone Mocha
