= List of very severe cyclonic storms =

Cyclone Arnab near peak intensity while approaching India on 27 October, 2026

A Very Severe Cyclonic Storm is the third highest category used by the India Meteorological Department (IMD) to classify tropical cyclones, within the North Indian Ocean tropical cyclone basin between the Malay Peninsula and the Arabian Peninsula. Within the basin a very severe cyclonic storm is defined as a tropical cyclone that has 3-minute mean maximum sustained wind speeds of between 64–89 knots (119–165 km/h; 74–102 mph). The category was introduced alongside the Super Cyclonic Storm category during 1999 in order to replace the previously used Severe Cyclonic Storm with Core of Hurricane Winds. However, it was bifurcated during 2015, when the IMD introduced a new Extremely Severe Cyclonic Storm category. There have been at least eight storms that have attained such an intensity. The most recent very severe cyclonic storm was Cyclone Arnab in 2026.

== Background ==
The North Indian Ocean tropical cyclone basin is located to the north of the Equator, and encompasses the Bay of Bengal and the Arabian Sea, between the Malay Peninsula and the Arabian Peninsula. The basin is officially monitored by the India Meteorological Department's Regional Specialized Meteorological Centre in New Delhi, however, other national meteorological services such as the Bangladesh and Pakistan Meteorological Department's also monitor the basin.

The Very Severe Cyclonic Storm category was introduced during 1999 alongside Super Cyclonic Storms in order, to replace the previously used Severe Cyclonic Storm with Core of Hurricane Winds. At the time it was the second-highest category with systems having 3-minute sustained wind speeds of between 64–119 kn (119–220 km/h; 74–137 mph). However, during 2015 the category was bifurcated, after the IMD introduced a new Extremely Severe Cyclonic Storm category. As a result, very severe cyclonic storms are currently estimated, to have 3-minute sustained wind speeds of between 64–89 kn (119–165 km/h; 74–102 mph).

== Systems ==
Name	System dates	Sustained wind speeds	Pressure	Areas affected	Deaths	Damage (USD)	Refs
Unnamed	October 31, 1831	Not Specified	Not Specified	Orissa	22,000		
Unnamed	October 2 – 5, 1864	Not Specified	Not Specified	West Bengal	50,000		
Unnamed	April 28 – May 5, 1966	Not Specified	Not Specified				
Unnamed	October 8 – 11, 1967	155 km/h (100 mph)	980 hPa (28.94 inHg)				
Unnamed	October 20 – 24, 1967	150 km/h (90 mph)	986 hPa (29.12 inHg)				
Unnamed	December 4 – 8, 1967	130 km/h (80 mph)	988 hPa (29.18 inHg)				
Unnamed	September 29 – October 4, 1968	130 km/h (80 mph)	984 hPa (29.06 inHg)				
Unnamed	November 9 – 15, 1968	140 km/h (85 mph)	970 hPa (28.64 inHg)				
Unnamed	May 2 – 7, 1970	150 km/h (90 mph)	975 hPa (28.79 inHg)	Bangladesh, Myanmar			
Unnamed	October 18 – 22, 1970	130 km/h (80 mph)	980 hPa (28.94 inHg)	Tamil Nadu, West Bengal, Bangladesh	200-300		
Unnamed	September 27 – October 1, 1971	120 km/h (75 mph)	979 hPa (28.91 inHg)	West Bengal, Bangladesh			
Unnamed	December 14 – 21, 1971	130 km/h (80 mph)	987 hPa (29.15 inHg)	Arabia			
Unnamed	April 7 – 11, 1972	150 km/h (90 mph)	983 hPa (29.03 inHg)				
Unnamed	October 19 – 25, 1972	120 km/h (75 mph)	984 hPa (29.06 inHg)				
Unnamed	November 15 – 23, 1972	150 km/h (90 mph)	985 hPa (29.09 inHg)				
Unnamed	December 1 – 8, 1972	140 km/h (85 mph)	984 hPa (29.06 inHg)				
Pradeep	November 3 – 9, 1973	140 km/h (85 mph)	984 hPa (29.06 inHg)				
Contai	August 13 – 20, 1974	140 km/h (85 mph)	970 hPa (28.64 inHg)				
Unnamed	May 1 – 11, 1975	150 km/h (90 mph)	979 hPa (28.91 inHg)				
Unnamed	May 4 – 8, 1975	155 km/h (100 mph)	976 hPa (28.82 inHg)				
Mahuva	May 29 – June 3, 1976	130 km/h (80 mph)	970 hPa (28.64 inHg)				
Contai	September 8 – 19, 1976	130 km/h (80 mph)	977 hPa (28.85 inHg)				
Machilipatnam	November 3 – 6, 1976	120 km/h (75 mph)	987 hPa (29.15 inHg)				
Unnamed	December 28, 1976 – January 3, 1976	150 km/h (90 mph)	981 hPa (28.97 inHg)				
Unnamed	November 8 – 12, 1977	140 km/h (85 mph)	984 hPa (29.06 inHg)				
Unnamed	May 14 – 17, 1978	150 km/h (90 mph)	965 hPa (28.50 inHg)				
Unnamed	September 18 - 24, 1979	130 km/h (80 mph)	980 hPa (28.94 inHg)				
Unnamed	October 28 - November 3, 1981	120 km/h (75 mph)	983 hPa (29.03 inHg)				
Unnamed	November 16 - 20, 1981	120 km/h (75 mph)	983 hPa (29.03 inHg)				
Unnamed	December 4 - 11, 1981	140 km/h (85 mph)	980 hPa (28.94 inHg)				
BOB 01	May 21 - 26, 1985	120 km/h (75 mph)	Not Specified				
BOB 01	January 30 - February 4, 1987	140 km/h (85 mph)	970 hPa (28.64 inHg)				
ARB 01	November 12 - 15, 1993	120 km/h (75 mph)	986 hPa (29.12 inHg)				
ARB 02	November 15 - 20, 1994	120 km/h (75 mph)	984 hPa (29.06 inHg)				
BOB 07	November 8 - 9, 1995	145 km/h (90 mph)	978 hPa (28.88 inHg)				
BOB 08	November 6, 1996	145 km/h (90 mph)	978 hPa (28.88 inHg)				
BOB 09	December 3 - 4, 1996	120 km/h (75 mph)	984 hPa (29.06 inHg)				
BOB 08	November 15, 1998	145 km/h (90 mph)	982 hPa (29.00 inHg)				
BOB 09	November 21 - 22, 1998	120 km/h (75 mph)	984 hPa (29.06 inHg)				
BOB 01	May 12 - 14, 2003	120 km/h (75 mph)	980 hPa (28.94 inHg)				
Phet	June 2 - 4, 2010	155 km/h (100 mph)	964 hPa (28.47 inHg)				
Thane	December 25 - 31, 2011	140 km/h (85 mph)	969 hPa (28.61 inHg)				
Lehar	November 23 – 28, 2013	140 km/h (85 mph)	980 hPa (28.94 inHg)	Malay Peninsula, Andaman and Nicobar Islands, India			
Vardah	December 6 – 13, 2016	130 km/h (80 mph)	975 hPa (28.79 inHg)	Sumatra, Andaman and Nicobar Islands, Thailand; Malaysia, Sri Lanka, India			
Ockhi	November 29 - December 6, 2017	155 km/h (100 mph)	976 hPa (28.82 inHg)	Sri Lanka, South India, Western India, Maldives	137		
Luban	October 6 – 15, 2018	140 km/h (85 mph)	978 hPa (28.88 inHg)	Yemen, Oman	14		
Titli	October 8 – 13, 2018	150 km/h (90 mph)	972 hPa (28.70 inHg)	Andhra Pradesh, Odisha, West Bengal, Bangladesh	85		
Gaja	November 10 – 18, 2018	130 km/h (80 mph)	976 hPa (28.82 inHg)	Andaman Islands, India, Sri Lanka	46		
Vayu	June 10 – 17, 2019	150 km/h (90 mph)	970 hPa (28.64 inHg)	Maldives, India, Pakistan, Oman			
Hikaa	September 22 – 25, 2019	140 km/h (85 mph)	972 hPa (28.70 inHg)	Western India, Oman, Saudi Arabia, Yemen			
Bulbul	November 5 – 11, 2019	140 km/h (85 mph)	976 hPa (28.82 inHg)	Myanmar, Andaman and Nicobar Islands; Eastern India, Bangladesh			
Gati	November 21 – 24, 2020	140 km/h (85 mph)	976 hPa (28.82 inHg)	Socotra, Yemen, Somalia, Djibouti, Ethiopia	9	$1 million	
Nivar	November 23 – 27, 2020	120 km/h (75 mph)	980 hPa (28.94 inHg)	Sri Lanka, India	14	$600 million	
Yaas	May 23 – 28, 2021	130 km/h (80 mph)	972 hPa (28.70 inHg)	Sri Lanka, Andaman and Nicobar Islands, Myanmar, India, Bangladesh	20	$2.84 billion	
Hamoon	October 21-25, 2023	120 km/h (75 mph)	984 hPa (29.06 inHg)	Bangladesh, West Bengal, Mizoram	5	$250 million	

== Climatology ==
Very Severe Cyclonic Storms by month.
Month	Number of storms
January	1
February	0
March	0
April	1
May	7
June	2
July	0
August	1
September	5
October	7
November	16
December	8

Very Severe Cyclonic Storms by decade.
Period	Number of storms
1960s	5
1970s	19
1980s	5
1990s	7
2000s	1
2010s	11
2020s	4
