= List of super cyclonic storms =

List of tropical cyclones by scale

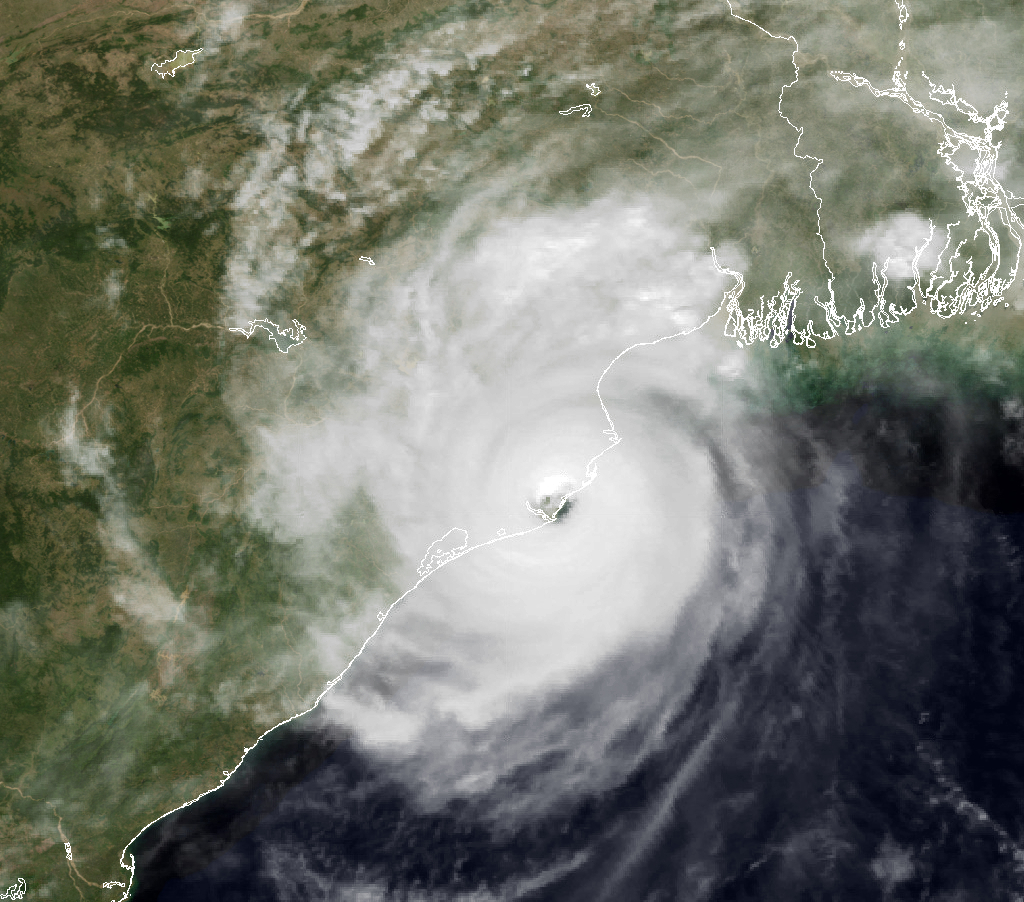
Satellite image of the 1999 Odisha cyclone making landfall on eastern India as one of the most intense tropical cyclones in North Indian Ocean

Super cyclonic storm is the highest category used by the India Meteorological Department (IMD) to classify tropical cyclones, within the North Indian Ocean tropical cyclone basin between the Malay Peninsula and the Arabian Peninsula. Within the basin, a super cyclonic storm is defined as a tropical cyclone that has 3-minute mean maximum sustained wind speeds of at least 120 knots (220 km/h; 140 mph). The category was formally introduced during the 1999 season alongside Very Severe Cyclonic Storms, in order to replace the previously used Severe Cyclonic Storm with Core of Hurricane Winds. There have been at least nine storms that have attained such an intensity. The most recent super cyclonic storm was Cyclone Amphan in 2020 North Indian Ocean cyclone season.

== Background ==
The North Indian Ocean tropical cyclone basin is located to the north of the Equator, and encompasses the Bay of Bengal and the Arabian Sea, between the Malay Peninsula and the Arabian Peninsula. The basin is officially monitored by the India Meteorological Department's Regional Specialized Meteorological Centre in New Delhi. Within the basin a Super Cyclonic Storm is defined as a tropical cyclone, that has 3-minute mean maximum sustained wind speeds of at least 120 knots (220 km/h; 140 mph). The category was introduced during 1999 alongside Very Severe Cyclonic Storms in order, to replace the previously used Severe Cyclonic Storm with Core of Hurricane Winds. Should a Super Cyclonic Storm impact land at or near its peak intensity, then it is expected to cause large scale flooding and extensive structural damage to residential and industrial buildings as well as bridges. It is also expected to disrupt communications and the power supply as well as large-scale disruption to rail and road traffic.

== Systems ==
Name	Dates as a super cyclonic storm (Note: Dates are given in Coordinated Universal Time.)	Duration	Sustained wind speeds	Pressure	Areas affected	Deaths	Damage (USD) (Note: All damage values are in USD of their respective years.)	Refs
Calcutta	October 1737	Not Specified	Not Specified	Not Specified	West Bengal	300,000	Unknown	
Great Backerganj	October 29 - November 1, 1876	Not Specified	220 km/h (140 mph)	Not Specified	Bangladesh	200,000	Unknown	
Odisha	September 1885	Not Specified	Not Specified	919 hPa (27.14 inHg)	Odisha	5,000	Unknown	
Rameswaram	December 8, 1964	Not Specified	240 km/h (150 mph)	970 hPa (28.64 inHg)	Sri Lanka, India	1,800	$150 million	
Myanmar	May 9 - 10, 1968	1 day	220 km/h (140 mph)	953 hPa (28.14 inHg)	Myanmar	1,000		
Andhra Pradesh	November 18 - 19, 1977	1 day	220 km/h (140 mph)	943 hPa (27.85 inHg)				
Sri Lanka	November 23 - 24, 1978	1 day	220 km/h (140 mph)	938 hPa (27.70 inHg)				
Gay	November 1989	Not Specified	220 km/h (140 mph)	930 hPa (27.46 inHg)	Thailand, Myanmar, India	1,036	$521 million	
Andhra Pradesh	May 8, 1990	18 hours	235 km/h (145 mph)	920 hPa (27.17 inHg)	India	967	$600 million	
Bangladesh	April 29, 1991	1 day	235 km/h (145 mph)	918 hPa (27.11 inHg)	Bangladesh, Northeastern India, Myanmar	138,866	$1.7 billion	
Odisha	October 28 - 29, 1999	18 hours	260 km/h (160 mph)	912 hPa (26.93 inHg)	Thailand, Myanmar, Bangladesh, India	9,887	$4.44 billion	
Gonu	June 6, 2007	6 hours	235 km/h (145 mph)	920 hPa (27.17 inHg)	Oman, United Arab Emirates, Iran, Pakistan	78	$4.44 billion	
Kyarr	October 27 - 29, 2019	2 days 3 hours	240 km/h (150 mph)	922 hPa (27.23 inHg)	Western India, Oman, United Arab Emirates; Socotra, Somalia	5	Minimal	
Amphan	May 18 - 19, 2020	1 day	265 km/h (165 mph)	920 hPa (27.17 inHg)	Sri Lanka, Eastern India, Bangladesh	128	$14.3 billion	

== Climatology ==
Super cyclonic storms by month.
Month	Number of storms
April	1
May	3
June	1
September	1
October	3
November	3
December	1

Super cyclonic storms by decade.
Period	Number of storms
Pre-1960's	3
1960's	2
1970s	2
1980s	1
1990s	3
2000s	1
2010s	1
2020s	1

== See also ==
- List of Category 5 Atlantic hurricanes
- List of Category 5 Pacific hurricanes
- List of very intense tropical cyclones
