= Kyaw Soe =

Burmese government minister

- ကျော်စိုး

Deputy Minister for Science and Technology of Myanmar
- Incumbent
- Assumed office 15 November 2004

Personal details
- Born: 16 October 1944 (age 82) Burma
- Party: Union Solidarity and Development Party

Kyaw Soe (Burmese: ကျော်စိုး; born on 16 October 1944) is a former Deputy Minister for Science and Technology, after his appointment on 15 November 2004. He was previously the Director General of Department of Technical and Vocational Education.
