= 1968 North Indian Ocean cyclone season =

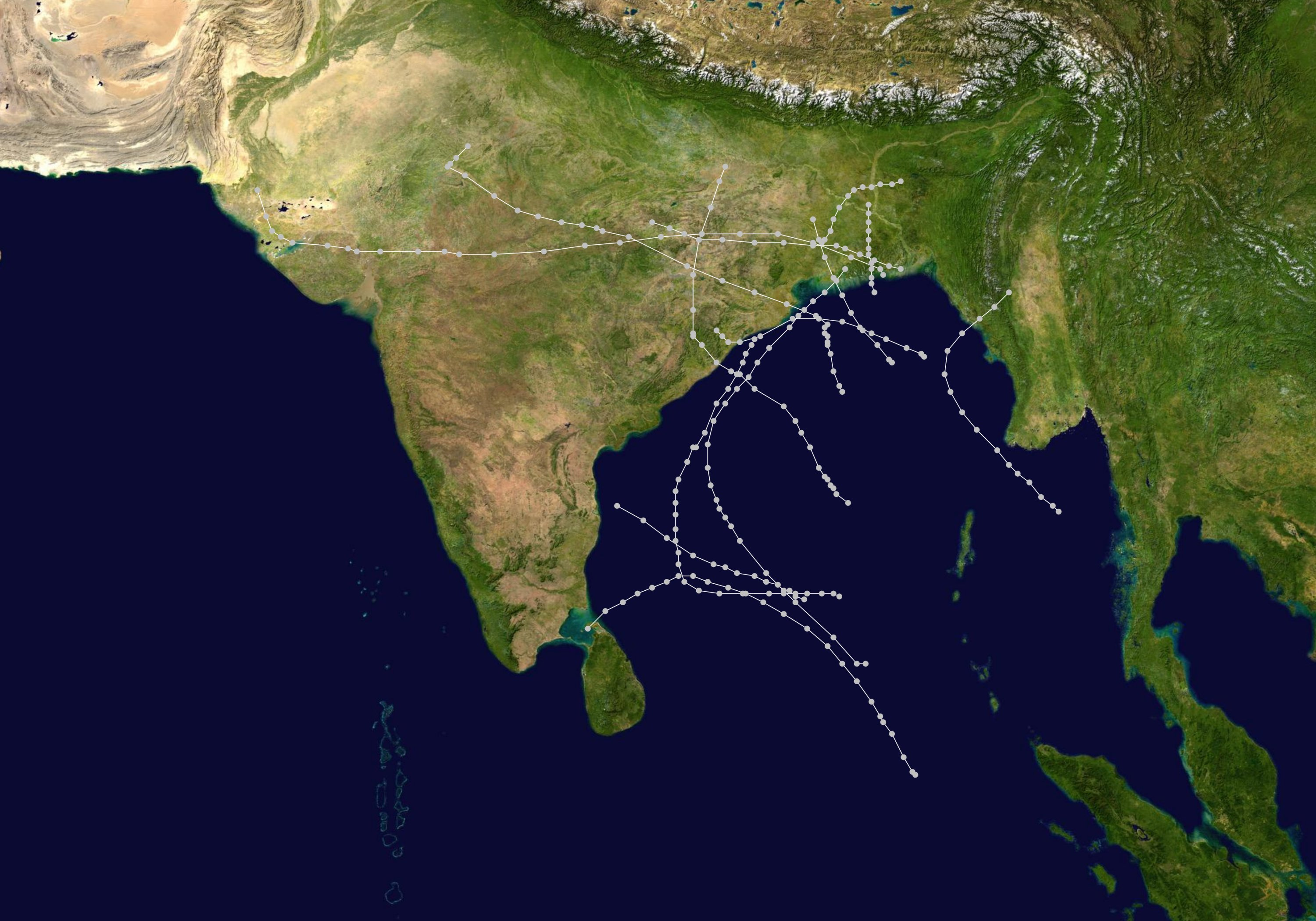
- Season summary map

Seasonal boundaries
- First system formed: May 7, 1968
- Last system dissipated: December 17, 1968

Strongest storm
- Name: One
  - Maximum winds: 220 km/h (140 mph)
  - Lowest pressure: 953 hPa (mbar)

Seasonal statistics
- Depressions: 13
- Cyclonic storms: 7
- Severe cyclonic storms: 4
- Total fatalities: ~1047
- Total damage: Unknown

Related articles
- 1968 Atlantic hurricane season; 1968 Pacific hurricane season; 1968 Pacific typhoon season

The 1968 North Indian Ocean cyclone season was an active cyclone season. Cyclone seasons in the Northern Indian Ocean have no official bounds, but cyclones tend to form between April and December, with peaks in May and November. These dates conventionally determine the period of each year when most tropical cyclones form in the basin. There are two main seas in the North Indian Ocean—the Bay of Bengal to the east of the Indian subcontinent, and the Arabian Sea to the west of India. The official Regional Specialized Meteorological Centre in this basin is the India Meteorological Department (IMD), while the Joint Typhoon Warning Center releases unofficial advisories. An average of four to six storms form in the North Indian Ocean every season. Cyclones occurring between the meridians 45°E and 100°E are included in the season by the IMD.

== Seasonal summary ==
The season started when a system formed in the Bay of Bengal and intensified to a cyclonic storm, becoming the first cyclonic storm of the year, later intensifying into the first severe cyclonic storm of the year. It made landfall near Akyab, Burma, causing catastrophic damages and loss of lives. After that, numerous monsoonal depressions formed, causing heavy rainfall and significant flooding, of which Deep Depression Five being the most damaging one. The season got its second cyclonic storm on September 10, with the storm making landfall on Gopalpur. On September 21, the third cyclonic storm and second severe cyclonic storm formed, when a severe cyclonic storm formed in the Bay of Bengal and made landfall in Andhra Pradesh – Orissa coast. The cyclone brought unusually heavy rainfall which caused severe flooding across Eastern India. Numerous landslides were reported in sub-Himalayan regions. Orissa braced for another severe cyclonic storm, this time a powerful one, which caused catastrophic damage in the region.

== Systems ==
=== Super Cyclonic Storm One ===
- Super cyclonic storm (IMD)
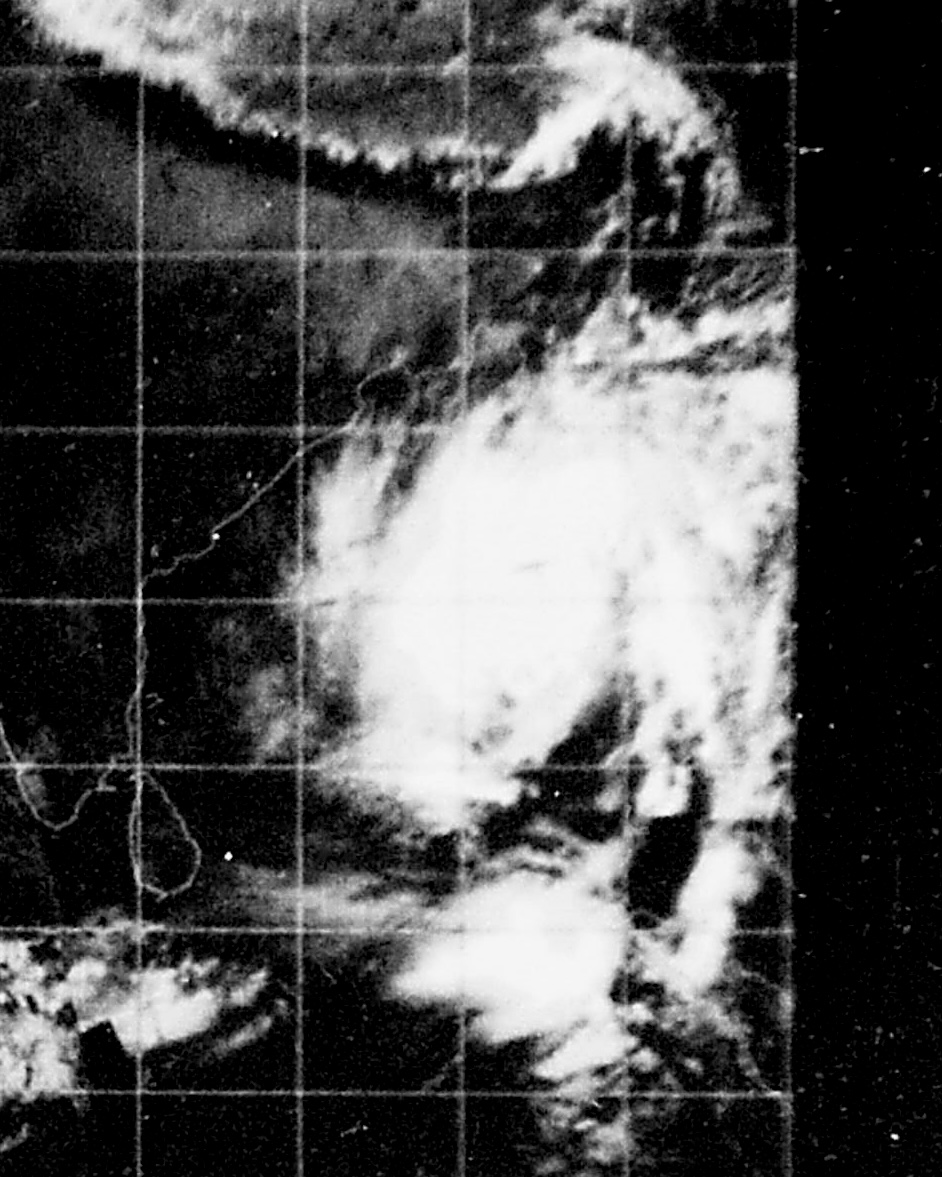
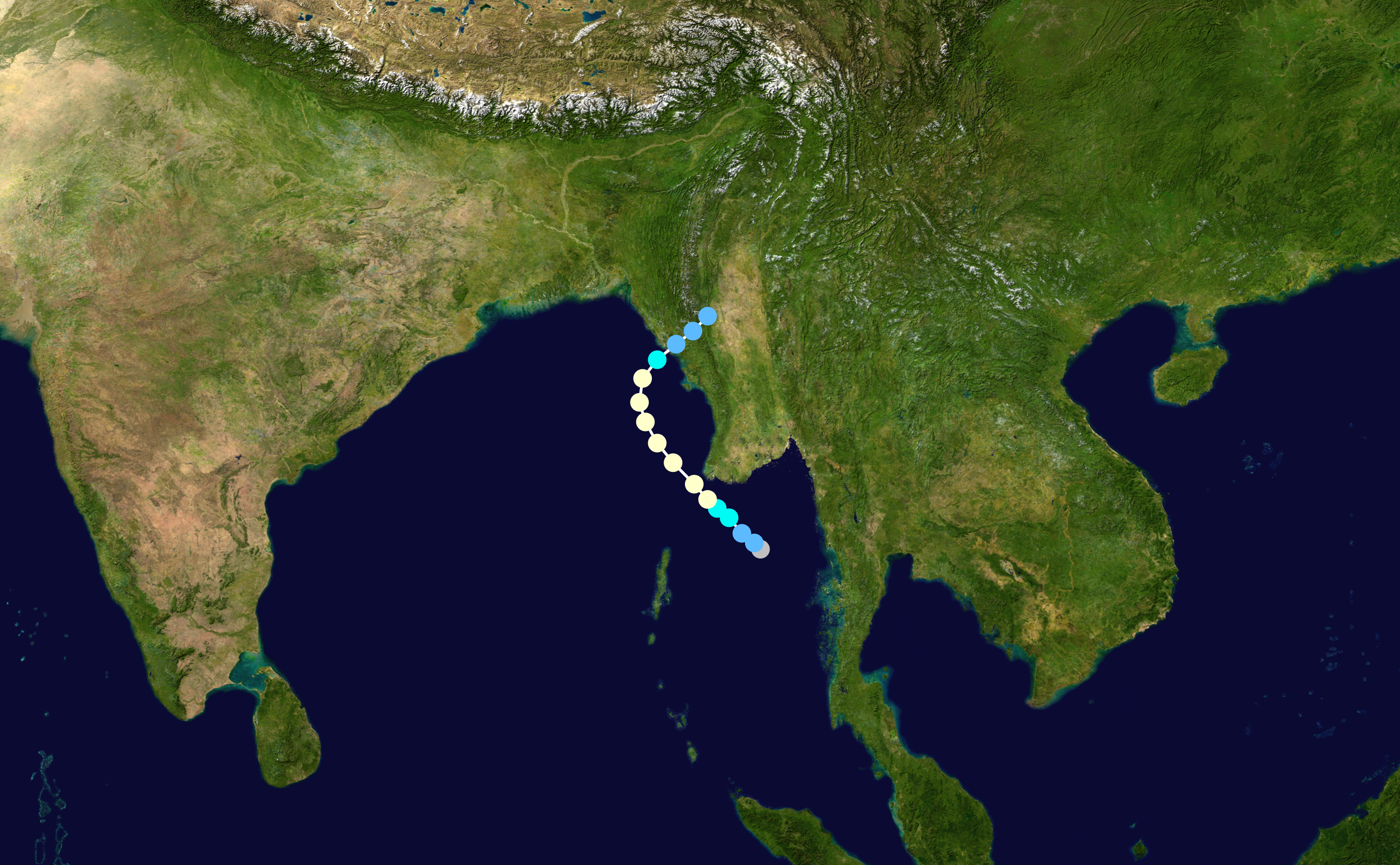
- Duration: May 7 – May 10
- Peak intensity: 220 km/h (140 mph) (3-min); 953 hPa (mbar)

On May 10, a powerful severe cyclonic storm struck the town of Akyab in Burma. It caused catastrophic damages in the region, causing US$3.169 million (K15 million) damage and 1,037 fatalities, with a further 2,000 people being declared missing.

=== Depression Two ===
- Depression (IMD)
- Tropical depression (SSHWS)
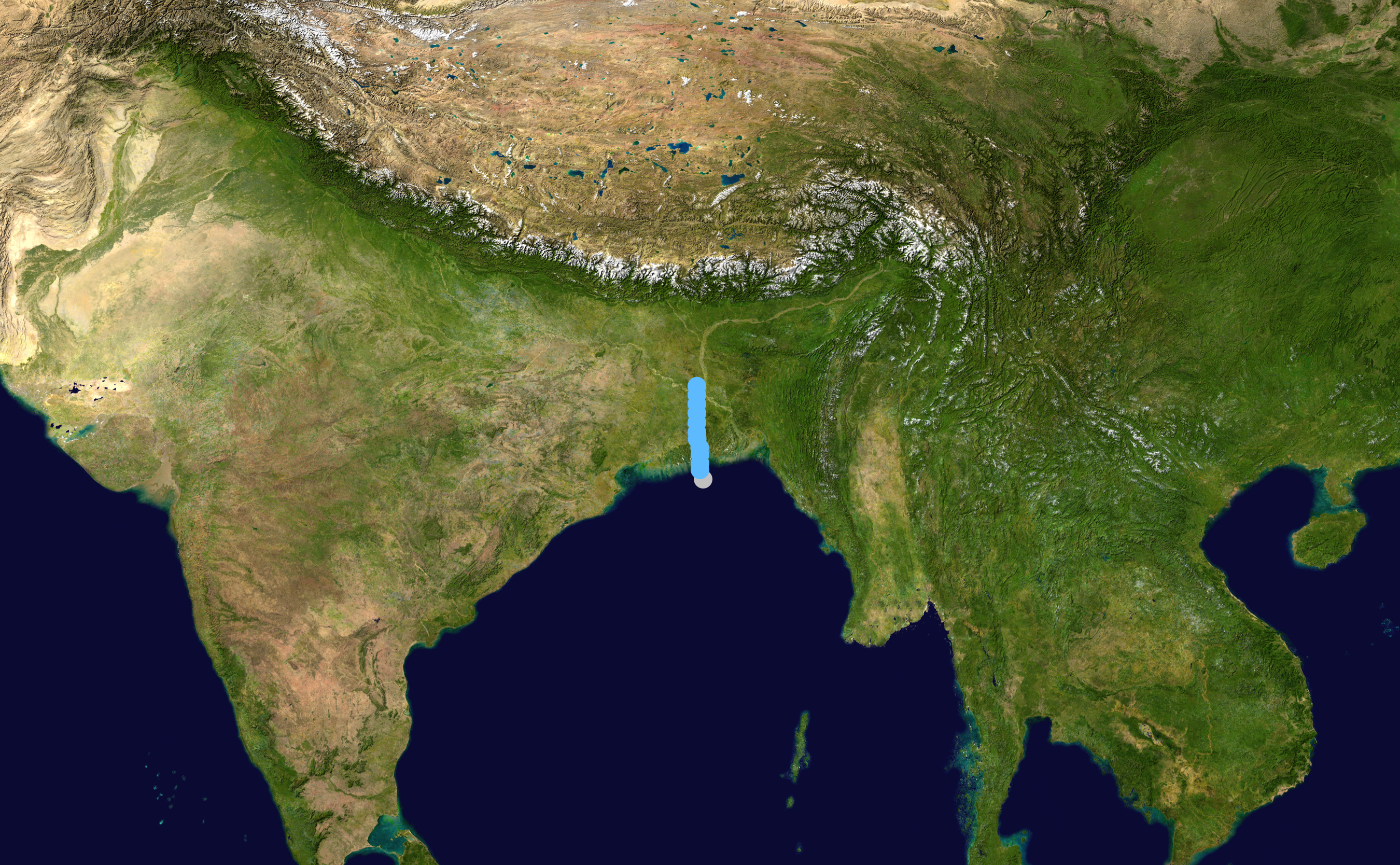
- Duration: June 12 – June 14
- Peak intensity: 45 km/h (30 mph) (3-min);

On June 18 in the evening, a disturbance was moving westwards across the Arakan coast which caused a low-pressure area to form in the Bay of Bengal. The tropical wave gradually intensified into a depression on June 12. The system then moved northwards and made landfall over the West Bengal – East Pakistani coast in the early morning of June 13 before 03:00 UTC (08:30 IST), the system's center was located near Khulna. The system continued to move its northward direction, it moving near Pabna by 12:00 UTC (17:30 IST), the same day. The system turned towards the west-northwest, persisting over West Bengal and Bihar. By the morning of June 15, the system weakened into a low-pressure area. The low-pressure area then moved eastwards towards north Assam by June 20.

The system extended the monsoon into West Bengal, Bihar and Odisha (formerly called Orissa). Heavy rainfall caused severe floods, damage to crops, and disruption traffic in Assam, according to the press. Approximately one million people were affected by floods and a few people also died due to flooding.

=== Land Depression Three ===
- Deep depression (IMD)
- Tropical depression (SSHWS)
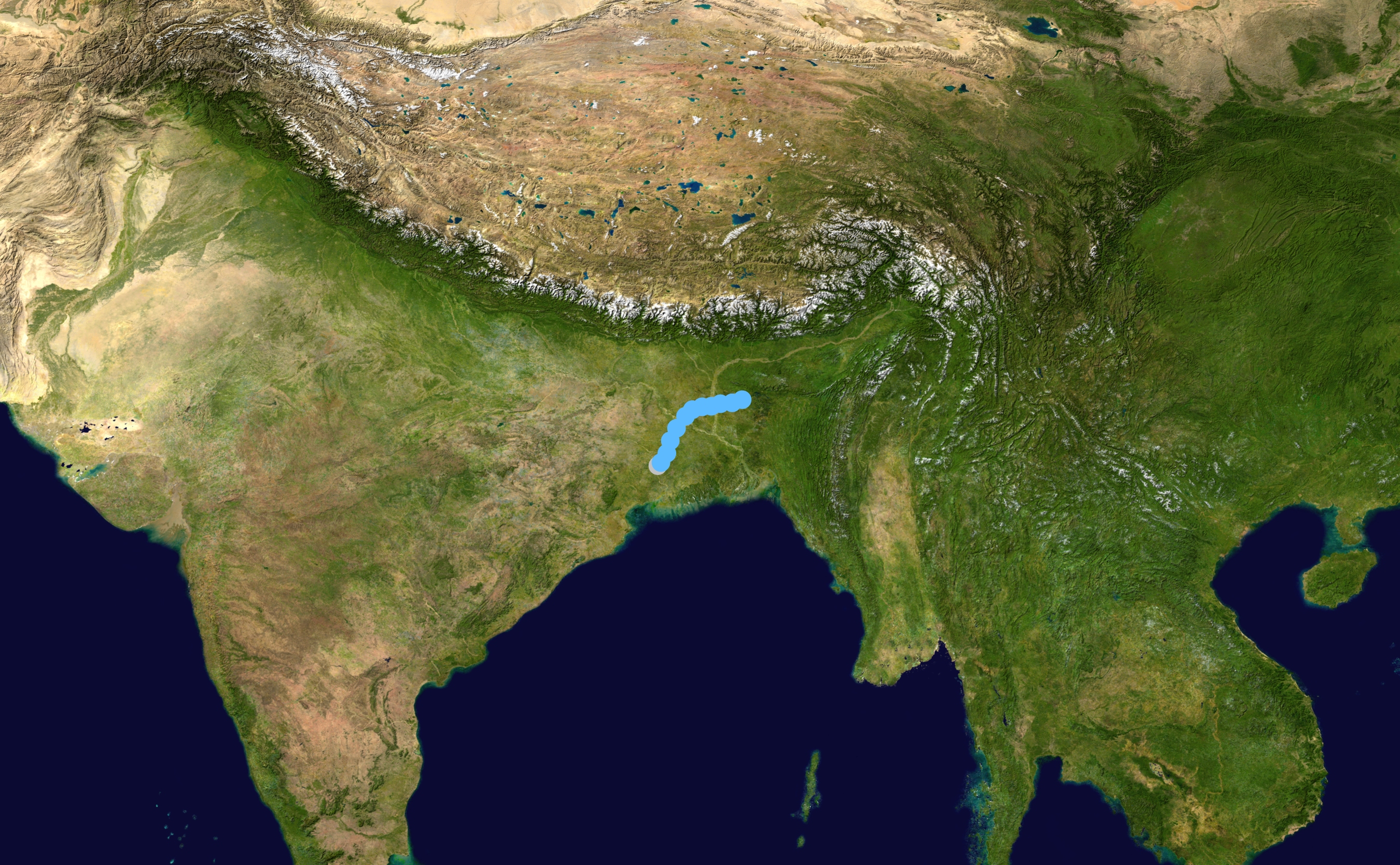
- Duration: July 9 – July 11
- Peak intensity: 55 km/h (35 mph) (3-min);

On July 8, an area of low pressure formed over the Bihar Plateau and adjoining Gangetic West Bengal, which intensified to a deep depression on the next day at 08:30 IST (03:00 UTC), 30 km (20 mi) to the southeast of Sriniketan. Traversing northeastward, it moved through East Pakistan before turning northwards. At 17:30 IST (12:00 UTC) of July 11, the system then weakened to a depression while located to the northwest of Mymensingh. It was then last noted on that day as it accelerated across northern Assam.

The deep depression caused heavy rainfall in Northeast India, with Calcutta recording over 18 cm (7.1 in) of rain on July 9, being regarded as the highest in fifty years. These conditions caused severe flooding in West Bengal, with ten people being killed. Half a million individuals were also affected, while rivers in Assam overflowed due to downpours.

=== Deep Depression Four ===
- Deep depression (IMD)
- Tropical depression (SSHWS)
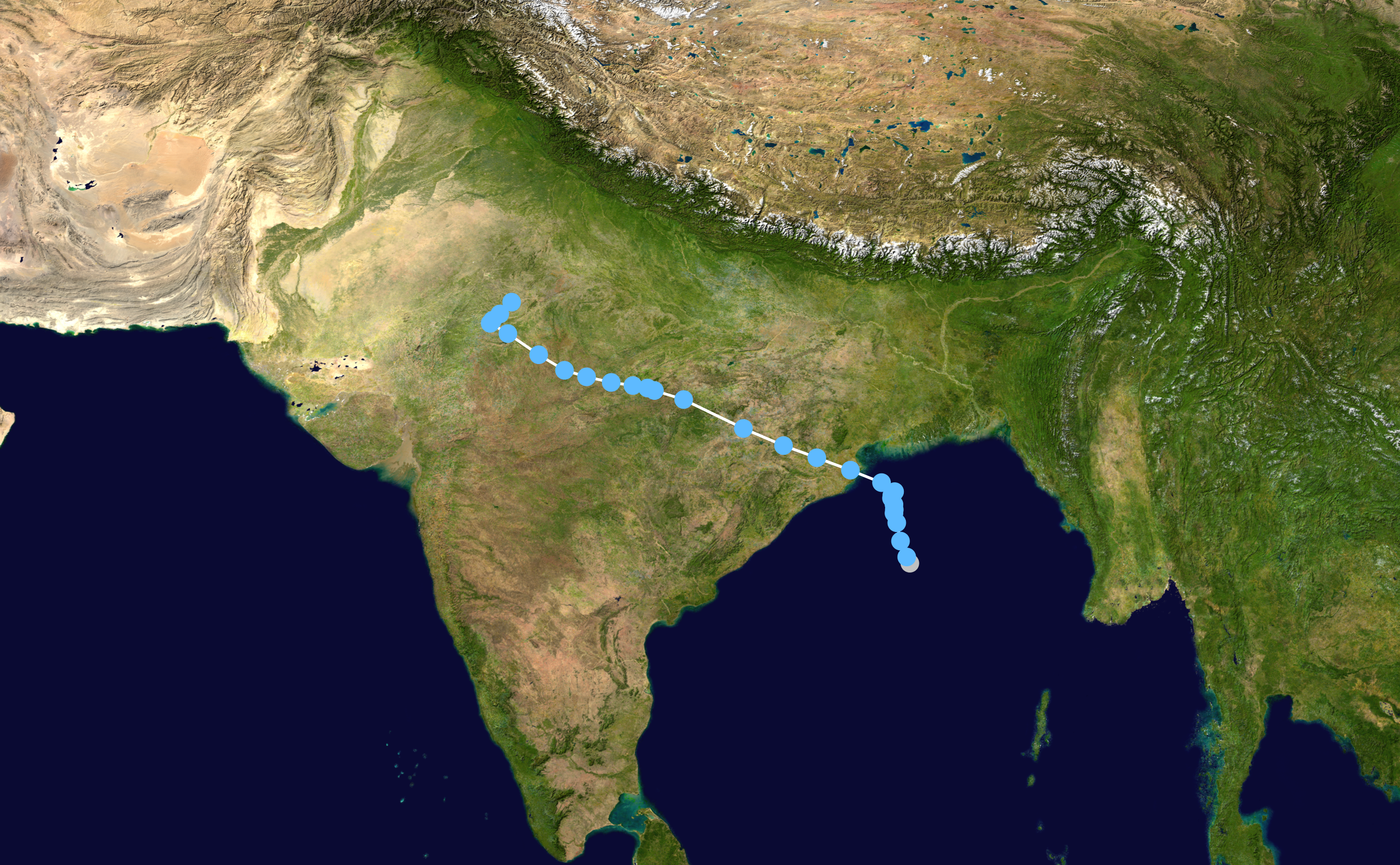
- Duration: July 26 – August 2
- Peak intensity: 55 km/h (35 mph) (3-min);

On the morning of July 23, an upper air cyclonic circulation was first noted, stretching from Thailand to Burma. Moving westwards overnight, a low-pressure area formed from this feature on the next day in the Bay of Bengal, becoming a well-marked system on July 25 and a depression on the next day at 18:30 IST (13:30 UTC) while located to the south of Calcutta. No ships were in the vicinity of the system to identify the exact position of the storm at this time; however, ESSA-6 satellite imagery showed that a cyclonic circulation was present. Traversing northwards, the depression further strengthened to a deep depression on July 28 in the morning. With no further intensification, the storm crossed the coast of Chandbali on that night before accelerating west-northwest. It rapidly weakened to a depression while moving inland, degenerating to an area of low pressure over northwest Madhya Pradesh before being last noted on August 4.

Under the system's influence, heavy rainfall was experienced in central India, being further exacerbated by an existing monsoon. Heavy flooding were also seen on east Rajasthan, disrupting road and rail activities.

=== Deep Depression Five ===
- Deep depression (IMD)
- Tropical storm (SSHWS)
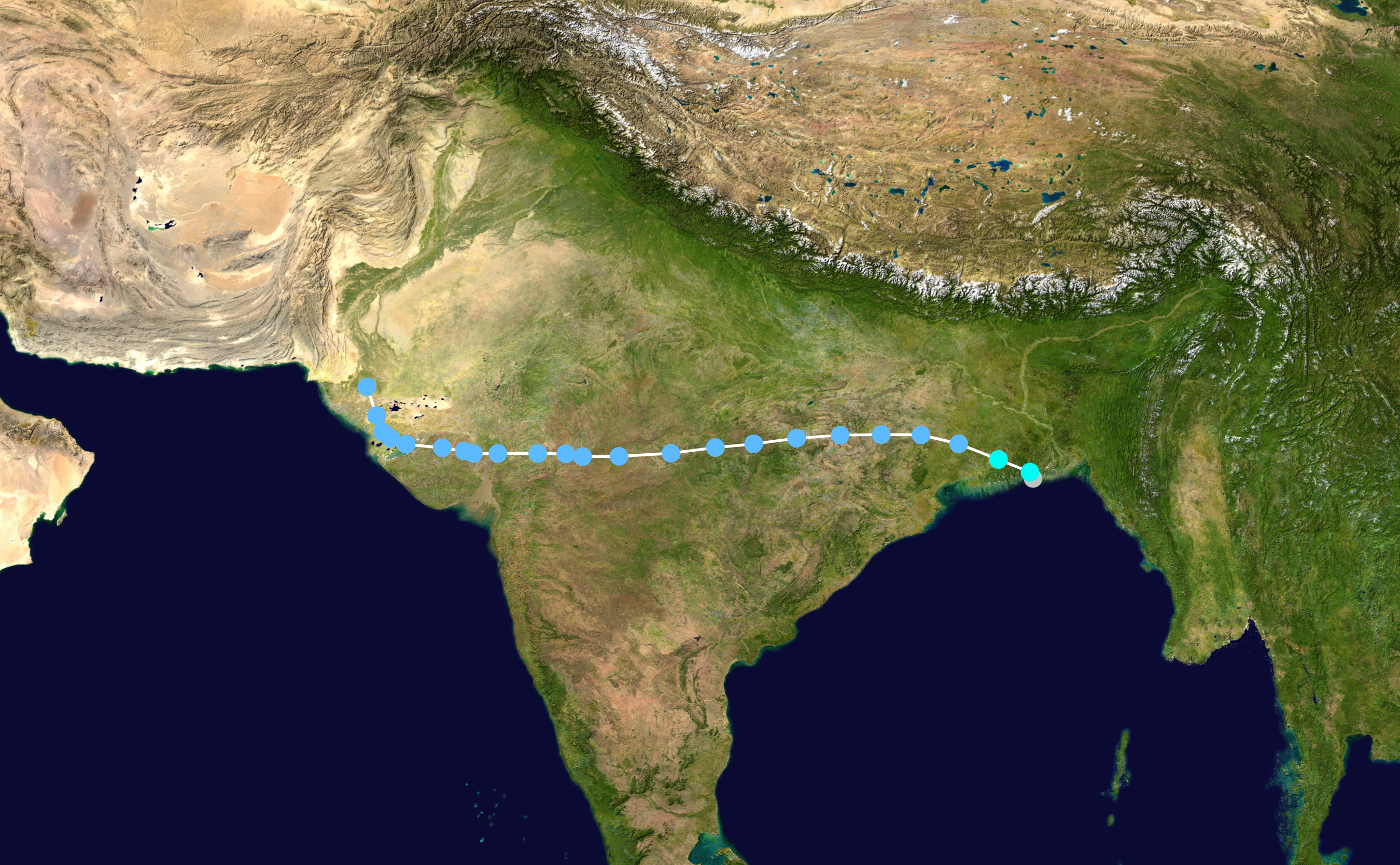
- Duration: August 3 – August 8
- Peak intensity: 55 km/h (35 mph) (3-min); 990.4 hPa (mbar)

A tropical wave was moving westwards across the Arakan – Chittagong coast on the morning of August 1. On the next day the tropical wave gradually organized and became a low-pressure area northeast of the Bay of Bengal and later concentrated into a depression on August 3. The depression rapidly moved westwards and intensified into a deep depression over northern Orissa and adjoining eastern parts of Madhya Pradesh and Bihar. Weather stations in these places reported pressure falls of 5–6 mb (0.1476–0.1772 inHg). The system later moved inland, though by August 8, at 08:30 IST (03:00 UTC), it weakened and merged into a seasonal low over West Pakistan, about 30 km (19 mi) northeast from Naliya.

While the system was moving towards Madhya Pradesh, there were reports of widespread rainfall over West Bengal, Bihar and Orissa on the morning of August 4, though few places experienced heavy rainfall. On the next day, widespread rainfall was reported over Madhya Pradesh and Vidarbha, with a few places experiencing scattered heavy to very heavy rainfall. As it moved towards Gujarat, widespread rainfall was reported in the state, north of Central Maharashtra and adjoining parts of Madhya Pradesh. The system's minimum pressure of 990.4 mbar (29.25 inHg) was recorded in Dohad, Gujarat. On the next day, Saurashtra and Kutch experienced heavy to very heavy rainfall. Because of this, severe flooding occurred in parts of north Orissa, West Bengal and Gujarat, causing inundation of many areas, disruption of road and rail communications and damage to standing crops. The worst-affected district was Midnapore, where flooding affected 500 thousand people. South Gujarat also got affected because of the overflowing of the Narmada and Tapti rivers. Rail communications between Gujarat and Bombay State were cut off, only being restored after a month. Floods was also reported in parts of Uttar Pradesh, Madhya Pradesh and Haryana. It also intensified the annual monsoon season in these regions.

=== Depression Six ===
- Depression (IMD)
- Tropical depression (SSHWS)
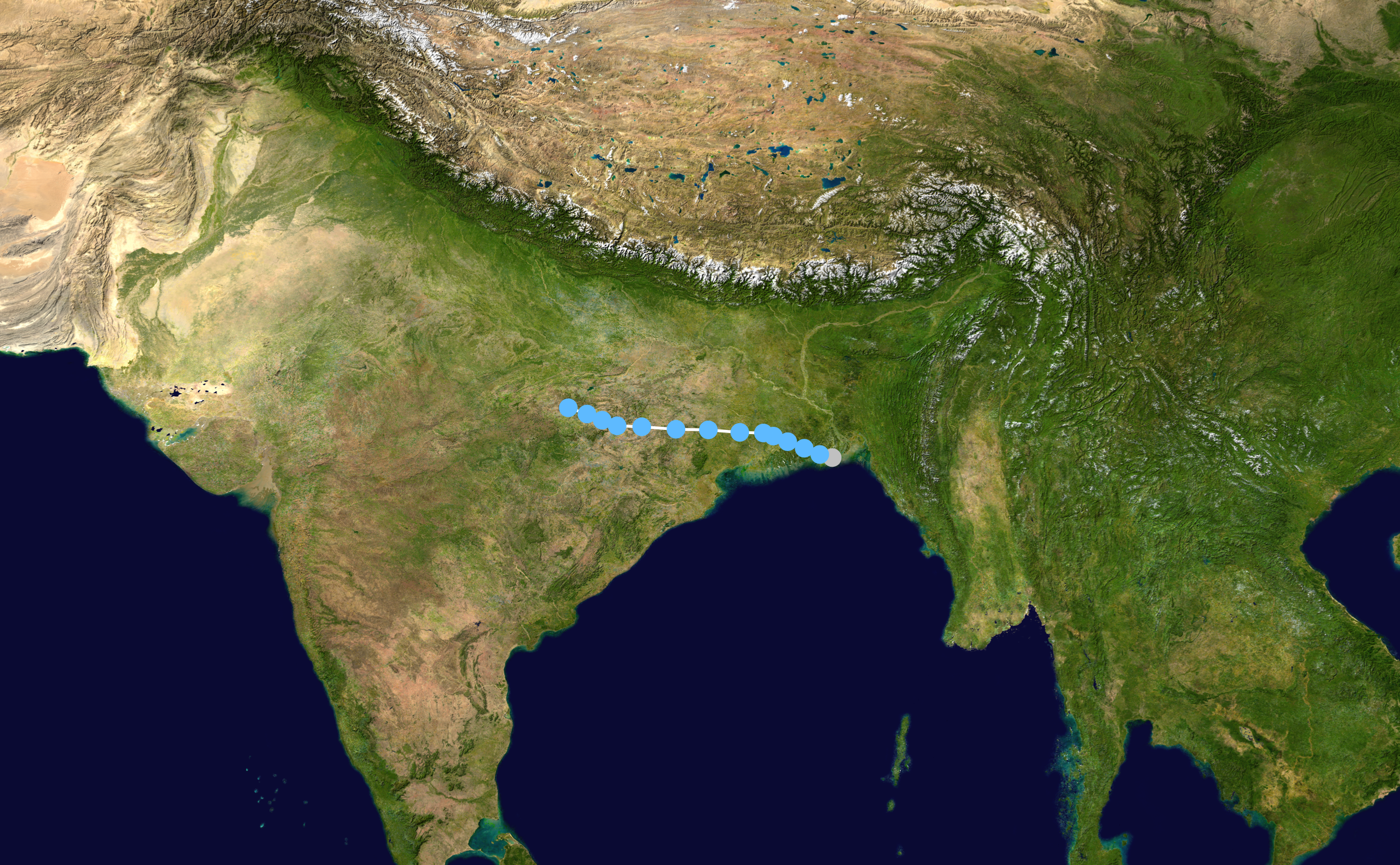
- Duration: August 11 – August 14
- Peak intensity: 45 km/h (30 mph) (3-min);

On August 7, an upper cyclonic circulation developed over northeast of Bay of Bengal. The circulation later developed into a low-pressure system on August 9, and by evening, the system became a well-marked low-pressure system. At 08:30 IST (03:00 UTC) on August 11, it intensified into a depression. The system moved inland over West Bengal, with its center reported to be 20 km (12 mi) south of Burdwan in the morning of August 12. It continued moving inland and persisted over north Madhya Pradesh until August 18, when it weakened and merged into a seasonal trough.

Under the influence of the storm, there were reports of widespread rainfall in Orissa, Uttar Pradesh and east Rajasthan. Because of heavy rainfall, the river Waiganga and its tributaries got flooded along the Narmada River, causing disruptions to river traffic. Moderate flooding was witnessed in the rivers Sarda, Ramganga and Ganga.

=== Depression Seven ===
- Depression (IMD)
- Tropical depression (SSHWS)
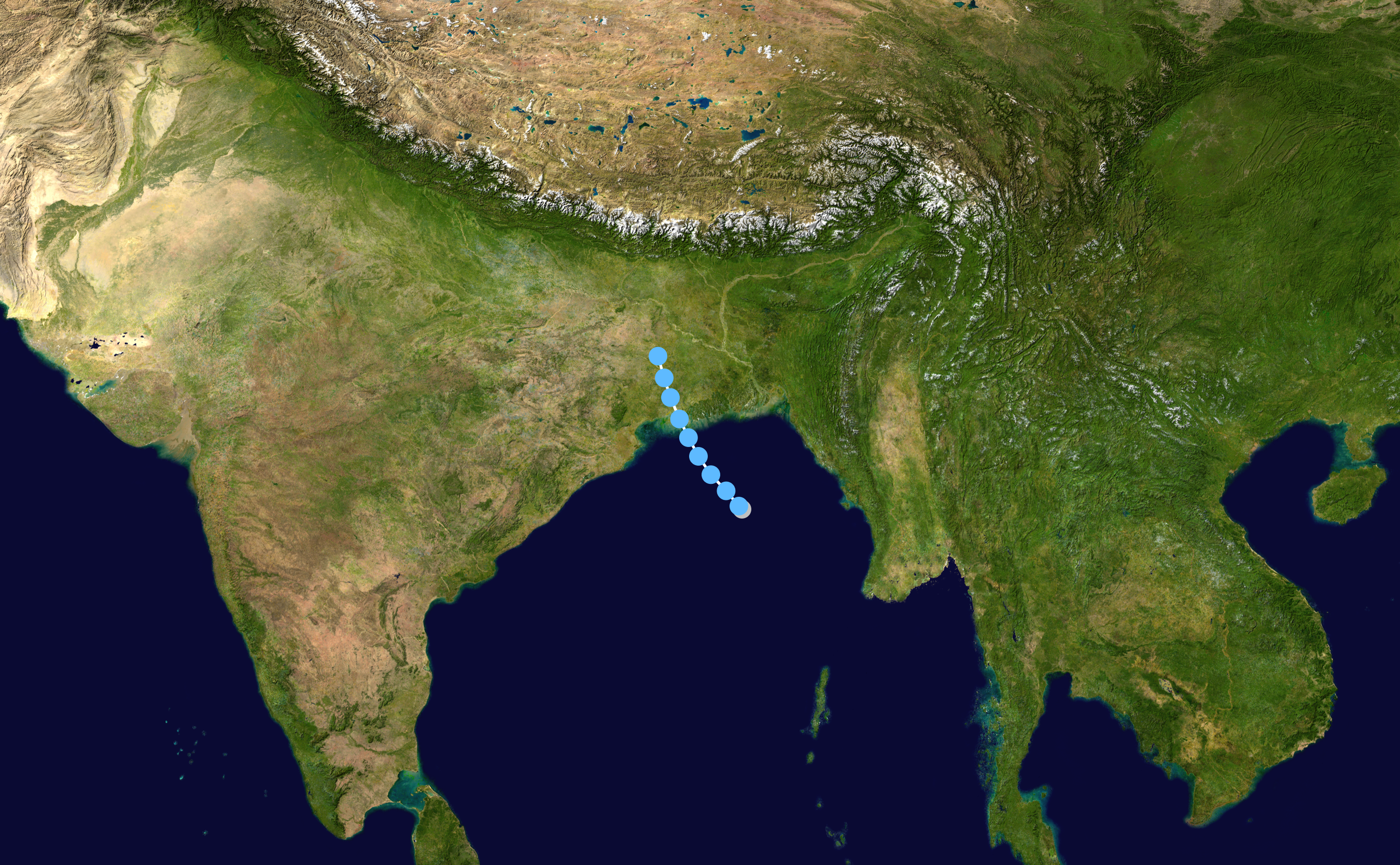
- Duration: August 22 – August 24
- Peak intensity: 45 km/h (30 mph) (3-min); 995.1 hPa (mbar)

On August 18, a tropical wave was noted over the Arakan – Tenasserim coast as seen by unusual droppings of atmospheric pressure over the region. On August 19, a disturbance formed from the tropical wave over northeast Bay of Bengal, which later became a low-pressure area on August 20 as it got more organized. On August 21, the low pressure system became more well-marked, before eventually becoming a depression on August 22. As it rapidly moved northwestwards, its center was located near the West Bengal coast by 08:30 IST (03:00 UTC), before later making landfall over Sagar Island later that day. It moved further inland, until on August 24, when it weakened into a low-pressure area over the central parts of West Bengal.

Under the influence of this system, widespread rainfall was reported in Orissa, Bihar, northeast India, Assam and the sub-Himalayan region of West Bengal.

=== Cyclonic Storm Eight ===
- Cyclonic storm (IMD)
- Tropical storm (SSHWS)
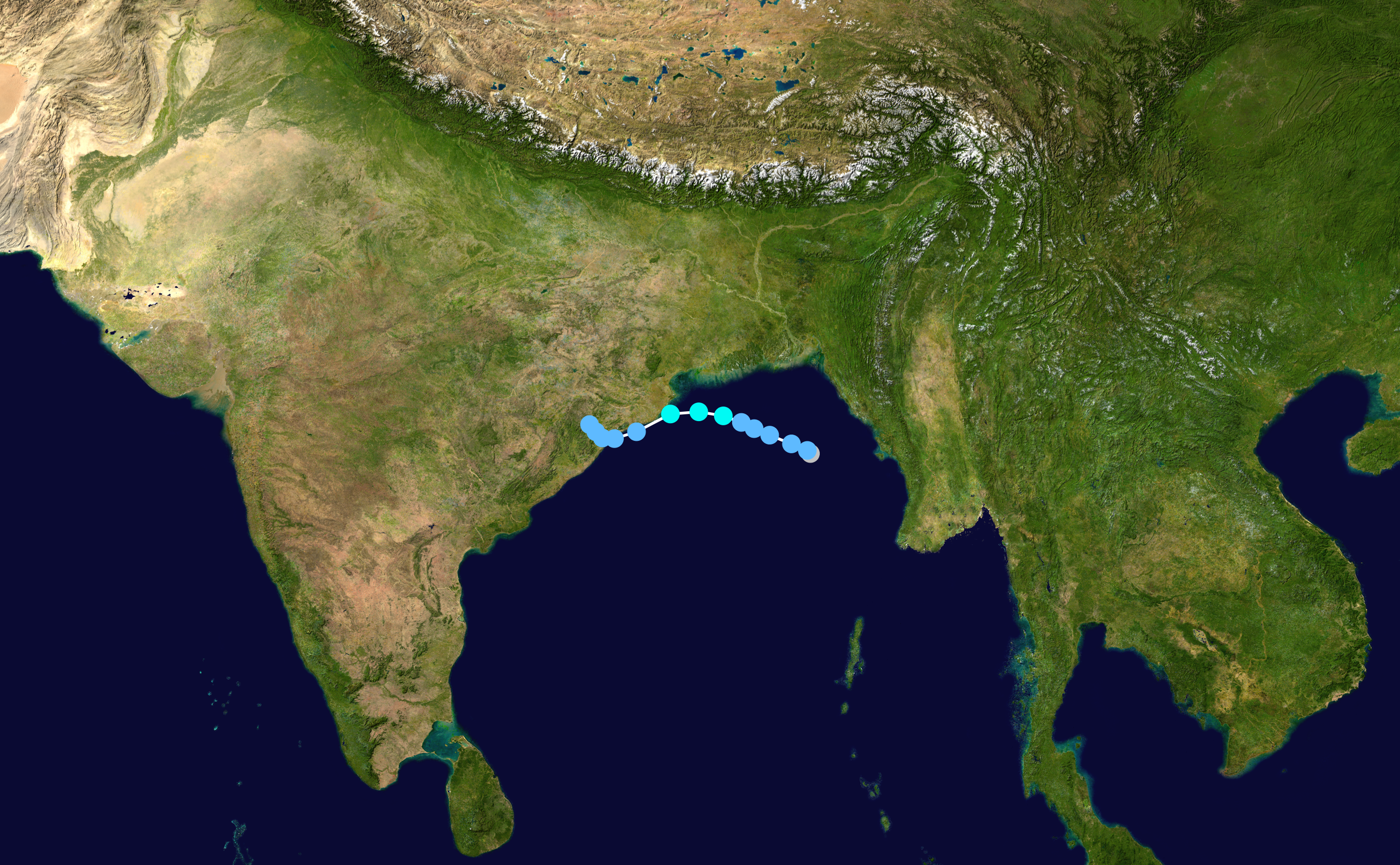
- Duration: September 10 – September 14
- Peak intensity: 65 km/h (40 mph) (3-min); 989.5 hPa (mbar)

On September 8, a trough of low pressure developed over the northwest Bay of Bengal, which later concentrated into a low-pressure area by September 9. It later intensified into a depression on September 10, before further intensifying into a deep depression in the night of the same day. On September 11, at 17:30 IST (12:00 UTC), Sandheads, which was located 129 km (80 mi) north of the center of the storm, recorded a pressure of 993.7 mb (29.34 inHg) and east-southeast winds of 25 kn (45 km/h; 30 mph). As it moved west-southwestwards, the deep depression intensified into a cyclonic storm on the night of September 11, becoming the second cyclonic storm of the season. By the next day, its center was located near Gopalpur. ESSA-6 satellite imagery showed that the storm had a circulation and a defined eye about half a degree in diameter. Gopalpur recorded the lowest barometric pressure of the storm at 989.5 mb (29.22 inHg). The storm later made landfall near Gopalpur in the evening. As it moved inland, it weakened into a deep depression at 08:30 IST (03:00 UTC) as it was centered 80 km (50 mi) east-southeast from Titlagarh. It further weakened into a depression because of less conductive environment over land. On September 14, the depression weakened into a low-pressure area over east Madhya Pradesh. The remnants of the system persisted over the region for two days and later moved towards north Madhya Pradesh and adjoining Uttar Pradesh, where it remained until September 20.

The system brought rainfall over the central parts of India, the northeast region and east Uttar Pradesh.

=== Very Severe Cyclonic Storm Nine ===
- Very severe cyclonic storm (IMD)
- Category 1 tropical cyclone (SSHWS)
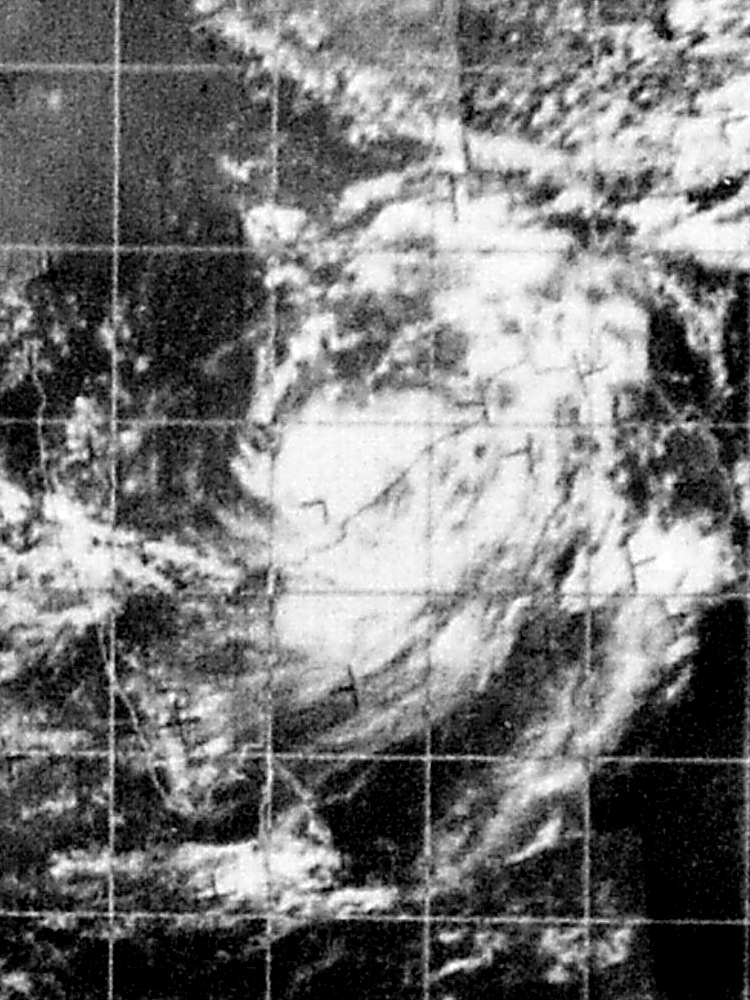
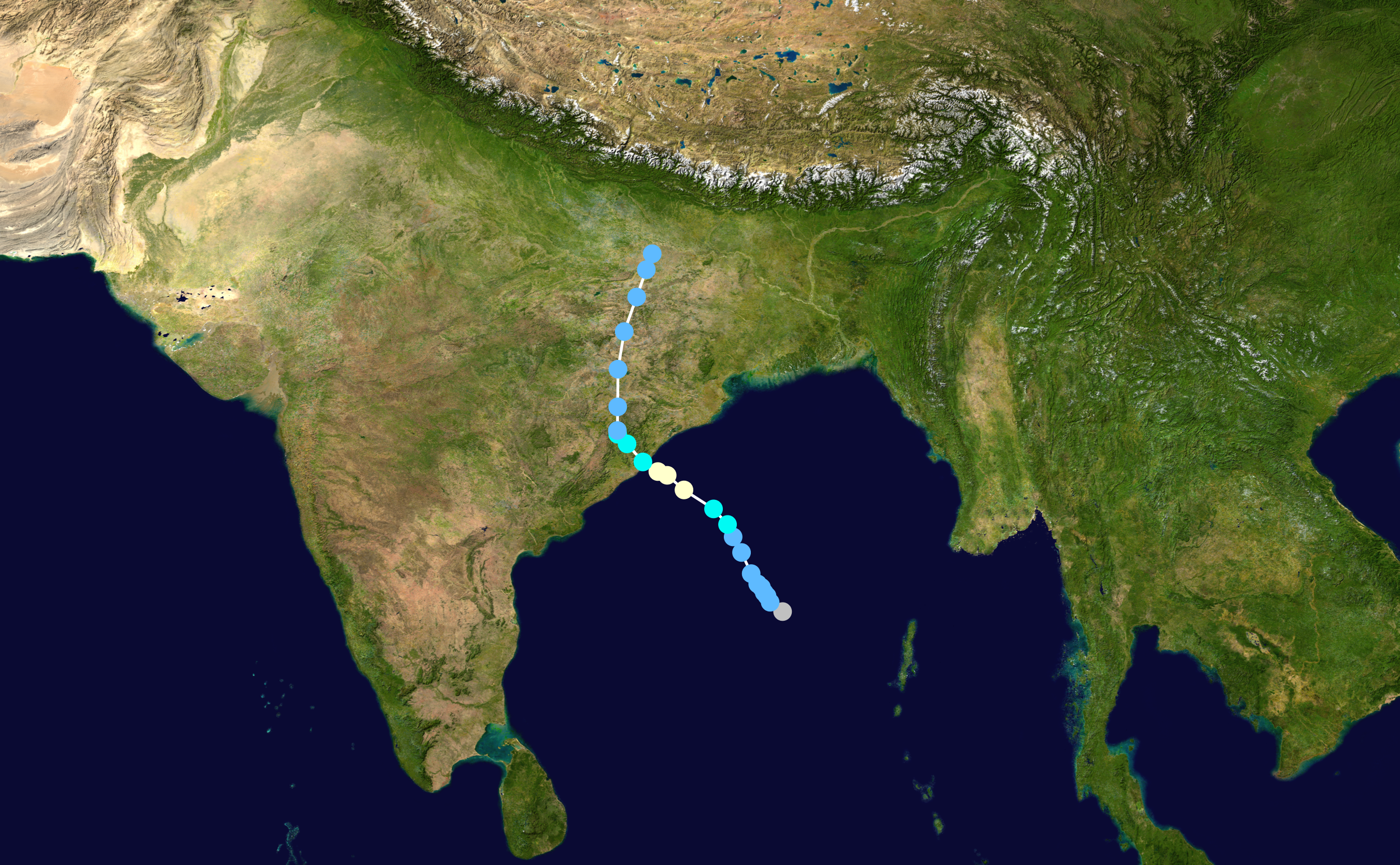
- Duration: September 29 – October 4
- Peak intensity: 130 km/h (80 mph) (3-min); 984 hPa (mbar)

=== Extremely Severe Cyclonic Storm Ten ===
- Extremely severe cyclonic storm (IMD)
- Category 1 tropical cyclone (SSHWS)
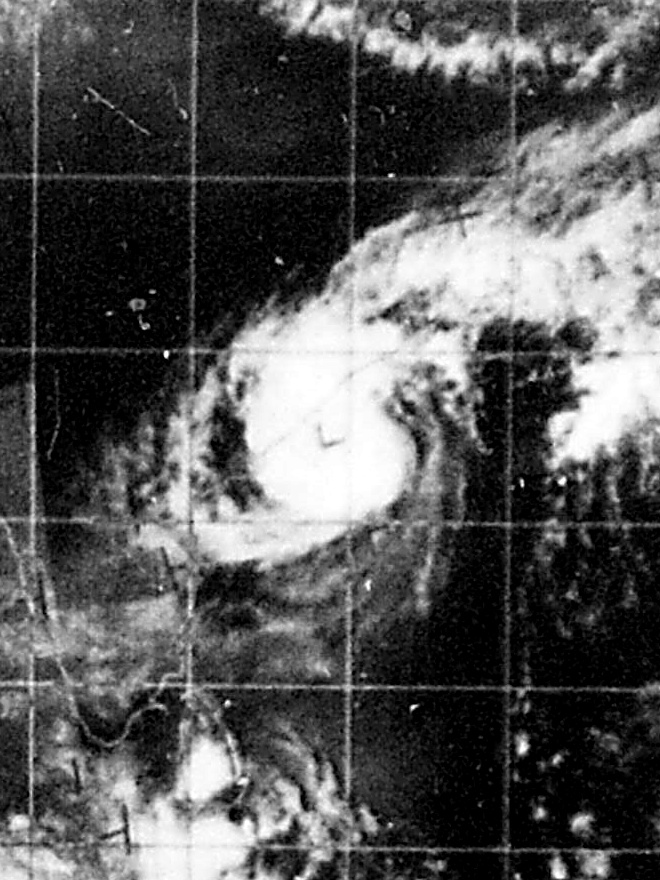
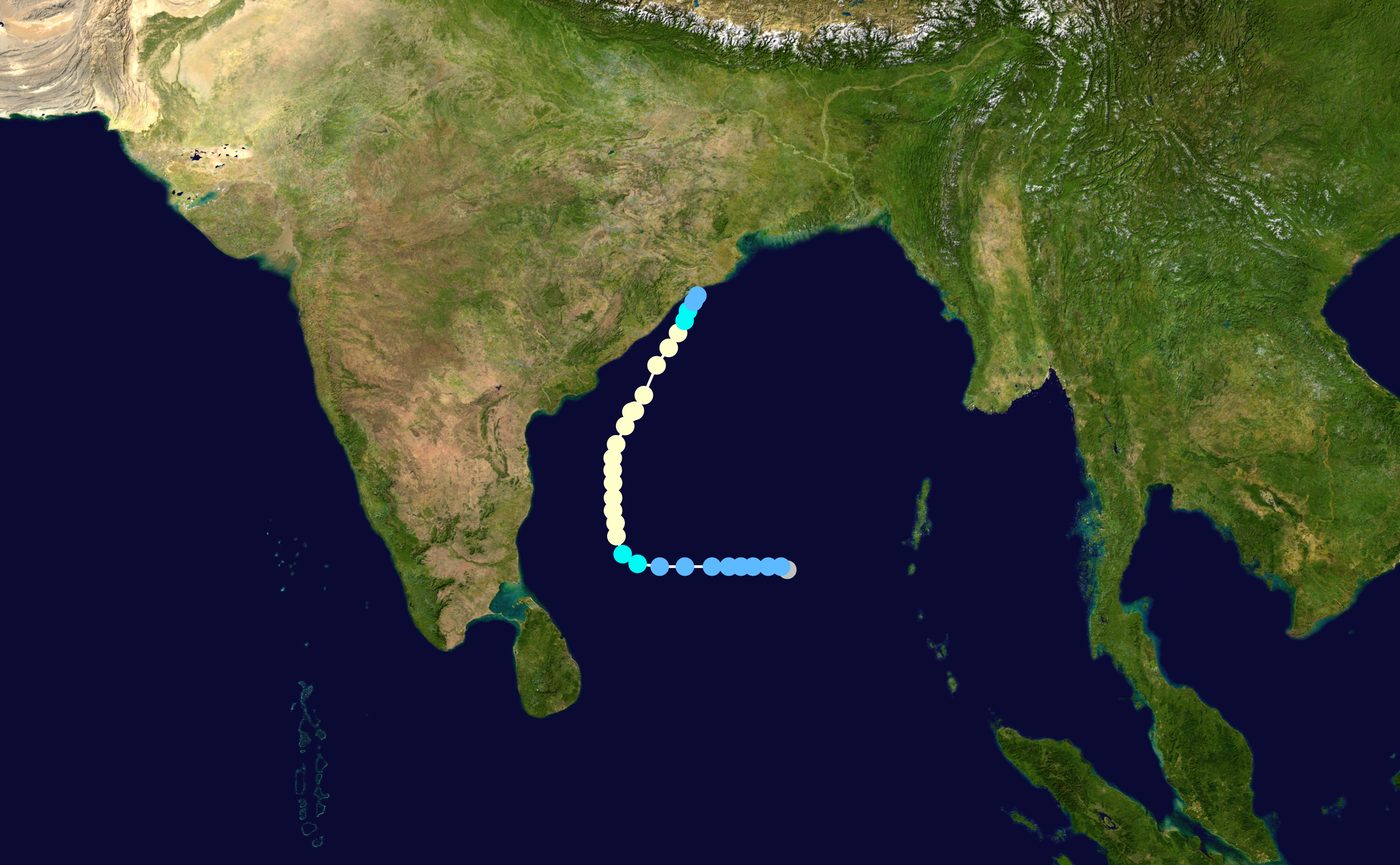
- Duration: October 21 – October 28
- Peak intensity: 195 km/h (120 mph) (3-min); 964 hPa (mbar)

=== Cyclonic Storm Eleven ===
- Cyclonic storm (IMD)
- Tropical storm (SSHWS)
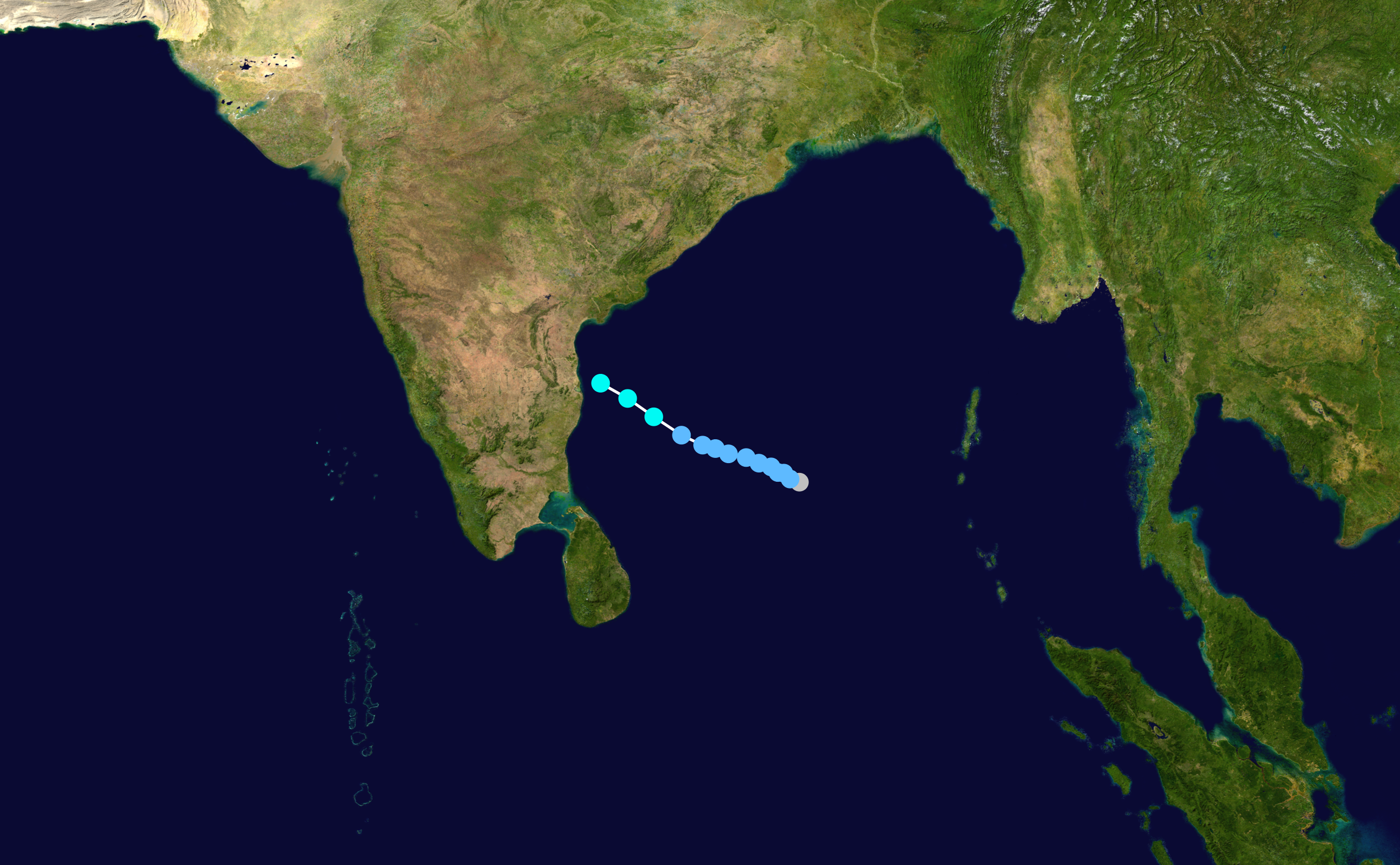
- Duration: November 2 – November 5
- Peak intensity: 60 km/h (35 mph) (3-min); 996 hPa (mbar)

On October 28, a tropical wave was moving in the Andaman Sea, causing drops of pressure in south Burma and the Andaman Islands. On the next day, it moved over the southeast Bay of Bengal, and by October 30, a low-pressure area formed over the same region. On October 31, it moved over the southwest Bay of Bengal and became a well-marked low-pressure area by the next day. The well-marked low-pressure area intensified into a depression on the morning of November 2, and by the next day it further intensified into a deep depression. On November 4, ESSA-6 satellite imagery showed the system had a circulation with spiral banding all around. As it moved north-westwards, it intensified into a cyclonic storm. On November 5, at 08:30 IST (03:00 UTC) the storm's center was close to the Madras – Andhra coast, approximately 30 km (19 mi) southeast from Nellore. On the basis of satellite imagery, the maximum wind speed of the cyclone was 60 km/h (37 mph), and with the help of Davidon–Fletcher–Powell formula, the minimum pressure was 996 mb (29.41 inHg) which is considered as a modern-day deep depression, however it was treated as a cyclonic storm at that time. On the same day, ESSA-6 satellite imagery showed that the system had tight banding surrounding the central circulation. The storm made landfall over south Andhra coast near Nellore during noon, weakening rapidly as it travelled over land. Since it weakened rapidly, it was not able to be tracked on the surface chart, however it was later found that continued as a cyclonic circulation over central India, located near Mysore State on the morning of November 6. The circulation later merged into a low-pressure area over Arabian Sea by the evening.

Widespread rainfall was reported in coastal Andhra Pradesh on November 5 and 6 and in Rayalaseema on November 6. The state of Madras experienced fairly widespread rain on November 7. Rainfall was also reported in Marathwada, central Maharashtra, Madras state and parts of Mysore state on November 8.

=== Very Severe Cyclonic Storm Twelve ===
- Very severe cyclonic storm (IMD)
- Category 1 tropical cyclone (SSHWS)
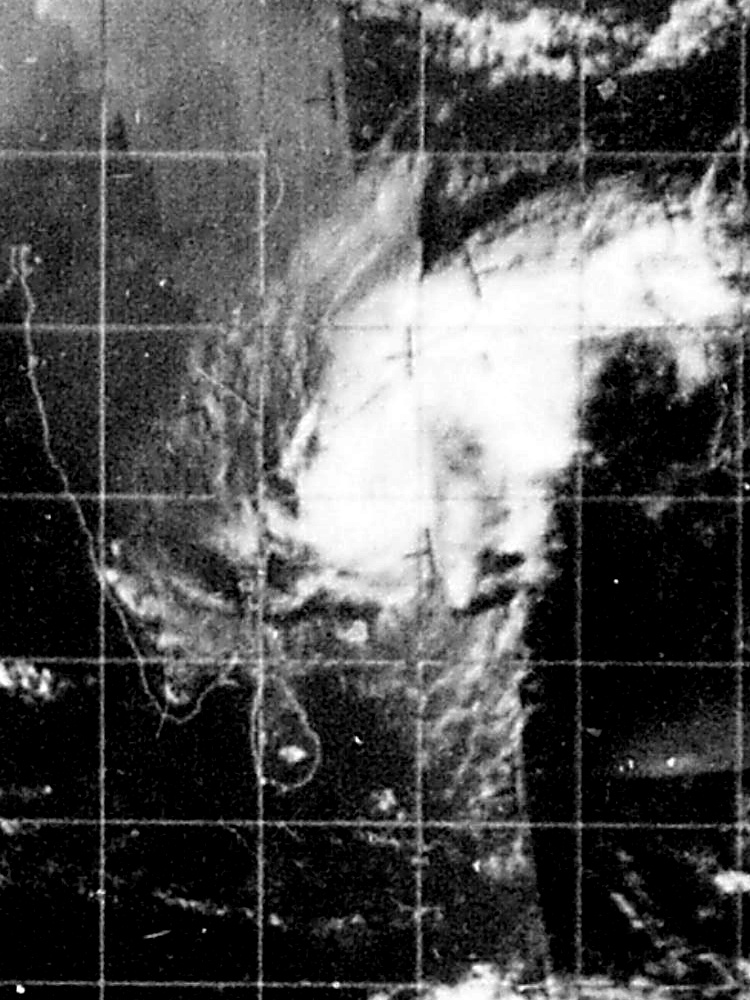
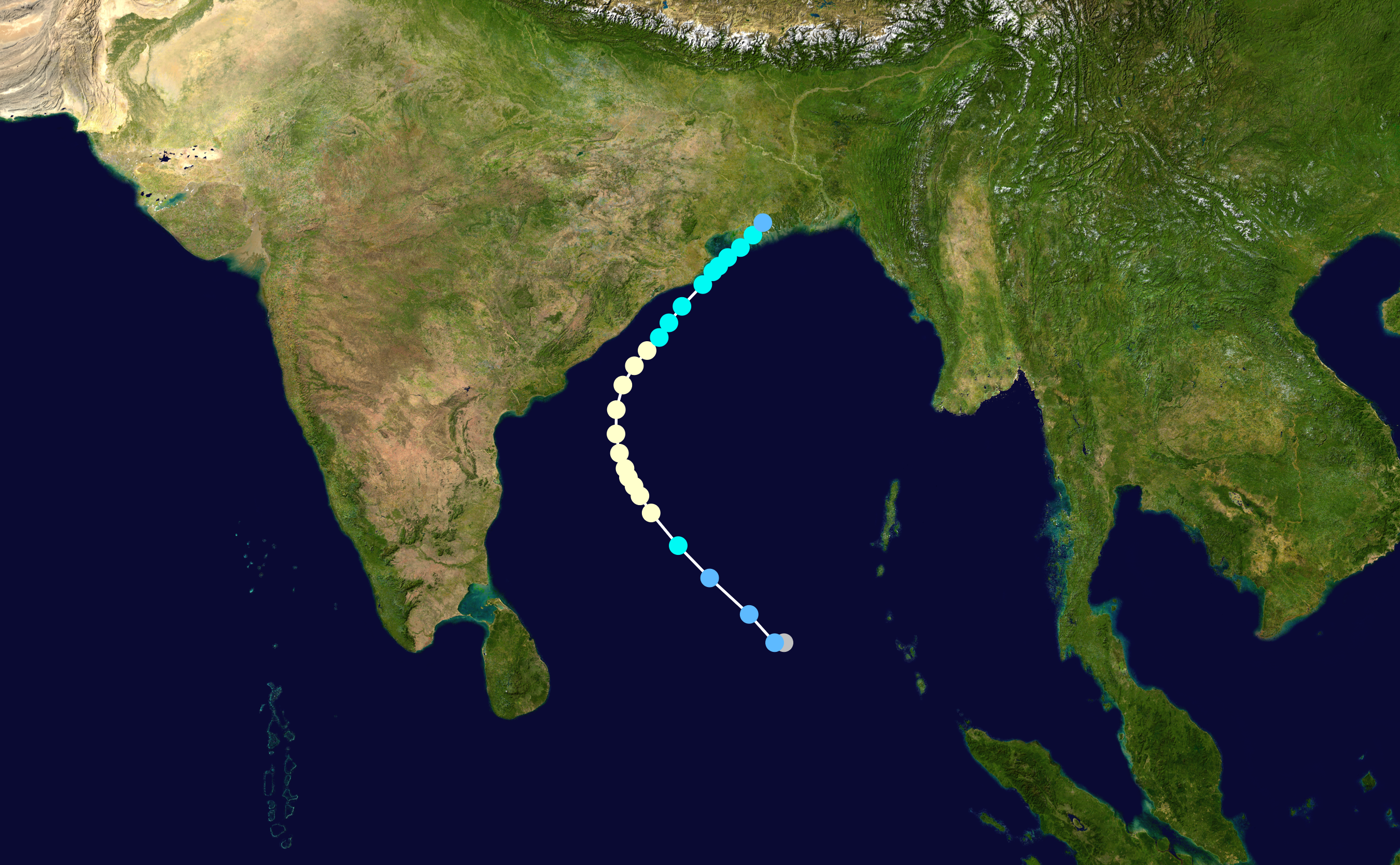
- Duration: November 9 – November 15
- Peak intensity: 140 km/h (85 mph) (3-min); 990 hPa (mbar)

On November 7, an east-moving tropical wave entered the Andaman Sea, later moving into the southeast Bay of Bengal, causing the formation of a low-pressure area on November 8. The low-pressure area became well-marked in the evening, and on November 9 in the morning, it became a depression. By the evening, as it moved north-westwards, it intensified into a deep depression. The system rapidly intensified into a severe cyclonic storm by the morning of November 10. Continuing in the same direction, the system had developed a well-developed eye with tight convection bands in all sectors, as per ESSA-6 satellite imagery. On November 11, in the evening, the system's movement shifted to a more north-northwesterly direction. Based on the satellite data, the maximum speed was 75 kn (139 km/h; 86 mph), and with the help of Fletcher's formula the minimum pressure was 990 mb (29.23 inHg). On November 12, at 11:00 IST (05:30 UTC), the system's eye disappeared in the ESSA-6 satellite imagery as convective bands surrounding the center weakened. On the evening of November 13, the system weakened into a cyclonic storm, and made landfall near Sagar Island on November 14. It rapidly weakened into a depression in the morning, 100 km (62 mi) southeast from Calcutta. The depression further weakened into a low-pressure area on November 15 in the evening, near East Pakistan. The remnant later moved over Assam by November 17.

The system caused heavy rainfall over the coastal districts of Orissa along with adjoining areas of Andhra Pradesh, West Bengal and southern Assam. According to media reports, heavy rainfall and gale-force winds affected the coastal districts of Ganjam and Puri, worsening the situation in the areas which were previously impacted by the cyclone which hit last month. Road, rail and air communication were destroyed.

=== Severe Cyclonic Storm Thirteen ===
- Severe cyclonic storm (IMD)
- Tropical storm (SSHWS)
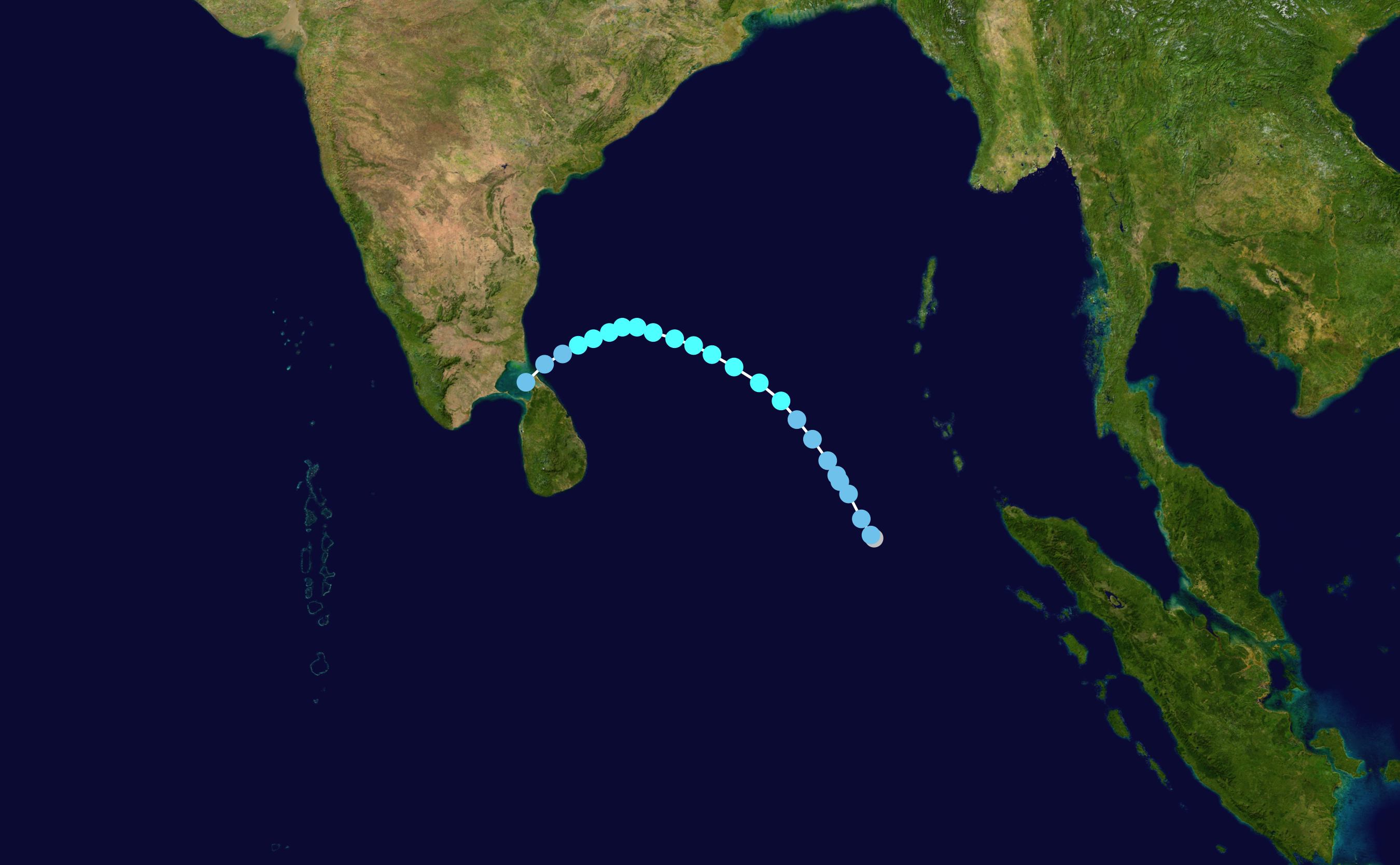
- Duration: December 12 – December 17
- Peak intensity: 110 km/h (70 mph) (3-min); 996 hPa (mbar)

On December 8, a low-pressure area entered the Andaman Sea, which later concentrated into a well-marked low-pressure area on December 11, intensifying into a depression on the next day. On December 13, the depression became a deep depression, and in the evening it became a cyclonic storm. The U.S. Weather Bureau issued a bulletin at 08:30 UTC, saying that the system had a dim eye which indicated the system's intensification. According to satellite reports, the system maintained a maximum wind speed of 60 kn (110 km/h; 70 mph), and using Fletcher's formula, its minimum pressure was estimated at 996 mb (29.41 inHg). On December 15, at 08:23 UTC, the eye was no longer visible on satellite imagery, which indicated the system had weakened slightly. On December 16, the storm started moving south-westwards, and by December 17, the evening, the storm weakened into a deep depression, near the coast of Ceylon. It further weakened on the next day and moved over the southern peninsula of the Indian subcontinent. The system became a well-marked low-pressure area on December 18 and by December 20, the remnant moved into the Arabian Sea.

Because it stayed most of its lifetime in the sea, not much impact occurred, however, rainfall still occurred in the Andaman and Nicobar Islands. The extreme southern peninsula experienced widespread rainfall on December 18 and 19.

== Season effects ==
This is a table of all storms in the 1968 North Indian Ocean cyclone season. It mentions all of the season's storms and their names, duration, peak intensities (according to the IMD storm scale), damage, and death totals. Damage and death totals include the damage and deaths caused when that storm was a precursor wave or extratropical low, and all of the damage figures are in 1968 USD.

Name	Dates	Peak intensity			Areas affected	Damage (USD)	Deaths	Ref(s).
Name	Dates	Category	Wind speed	Pressure	Areas affected	Damage (USD)	Deaths	Ref(s).
One	May 7 – 10	Super cyclonic storm	220 km/h (135 mph)	953 hPa (28.14 inHg)	Andaman and Nicobar Islands, Burma (now Myanmar)	$3.17 million	1,037	
Two	June 12 – 14	Depression	45 km/h (30 mph)	Not specified	Assam, Bihar, East Pakistan (present day Bangladesh), West Bengal	Unknown	Few	
Three	July 9 – 11	Deep Depression	55 km/h (35 mph)	Not specified	Bihar, East Pakistan, Northeast India, West Bengal	Unknown	10	
Four	July 26 – August 2	Deep Depression	55 km/h (35 mph)	Not specified	Central India, Odisha, Rajasthan	Unknown	Unknown	
Five	August 3 – 8	Deep Depression	55 km/h (35 mph)	990.4 hPa (29.25 inHg)	Central India, East Pakistan, Gujarat, Haryana, Jharkhand, Maharashtra, Uttar Pradesh, West Bengal	Unknown	None	
Six	August 11 – 14	Depression	45 km/h (30 mph)	Not specified	Central India, Jharkhand, Uttar Pradesh, West Bengal	Unknown	Unknown	
Seven	August 22 – 24	Depression	45 km/h (30 mph)	995.1 hPa (29.39 inHg)	Assam, Bihar, Meghalaya, Odisha, West Bengal	Unknown	None	
Eight	September 10 – 14	Cyclonic storm	65 km/h (40 mph)	989.5 hPa (29.22 inHg)	Central India, Odisha, Uttar Pradesh	Unknown	None	
Nine	September 29 – October 4	Very severe cyclonic storm	130 km/h (80 mph)	984 hPa (29.06 inHg)	Andhra Pradesh, Assam, Bihar, Odisha, Uttar Pradesh, West Bengal	Unknown	Unknown	
Ten	October 21 – 28	Extremely severe cyclonic storm	195 km/h (120 mph)	964 hPa (28.47 inHg)	Odisha	Unknown	Unknown	
Eleven	November 2 – 5	Deep Depression	55 km/h (35 mph)	996 hPa (29.41 inHg)	Andhra Pradesh, Madras State, Maharashtra, Mysore State	Unknown	Unknown	
Twelve	November 9 – 15	Very severe cyclonic storm	140 km/h (85 mph)	990 hPa (29.23 inHg)	Andhra Pradesh, Odisha, West Bengal	Unknown	Unknown	
Thirteen	December 12 – 17	Severe cyclonic storm	110 km/h (70 mph)	996 hPa (29.41 inHg)	Andaman and Nicobar Islands, Tamil Nadu	None	None	
Season aggregates
13 systems	May 7 – December 17		220 km/h (135 mph)	953 hPa (28.14 inHg)		≥$3.17 million	≥1047	

== See also ==
- North Indian Ocean tropical cyclone
- List of tropical cyclone records
- 1968 Atlantic hurricane season
- 1968 Pacific hurricane season
- 1968 Pacific typhoon season
- Australian region cyclone seasons: 1967–68 1968–69
- South Pacific cyclone seasons: 1967–68 1968–69
- South-West Indian Ocean cyclone seasons: 1967–68 1968–69
