= Northern Indic =

North or Northern Indic may refer to anything from the northern parts of the Indian subcontinent, such as:

- Northern Indo-Aryan languages, also known as the Northern Indic languages
- Northern Brahmic script, also known as the Northern Indic script

== See also ==
- Indic (disambiguation)
- Indic languages (disambiguation)
- North India
- North Indian Ocean
