= Indic =

Indic may refer to:

- Indic languages (disambiguation)
- Indo-Aryan peoples
- Various scripts:
  - Brahmic scripts, a family of scripts used to write Indian and other Asian languages
  - Kharosthi (extinct)
- Indian numerals
- Indian religions, also known as the Dharmic religions
- Other things related to the Indian subcontinent

== See also ==
- Inđić, a Serbian surname
- Northern Indic (disambiguation)
- Indica (disambiguation)
