= North Indian Ocean tropical cyclone =

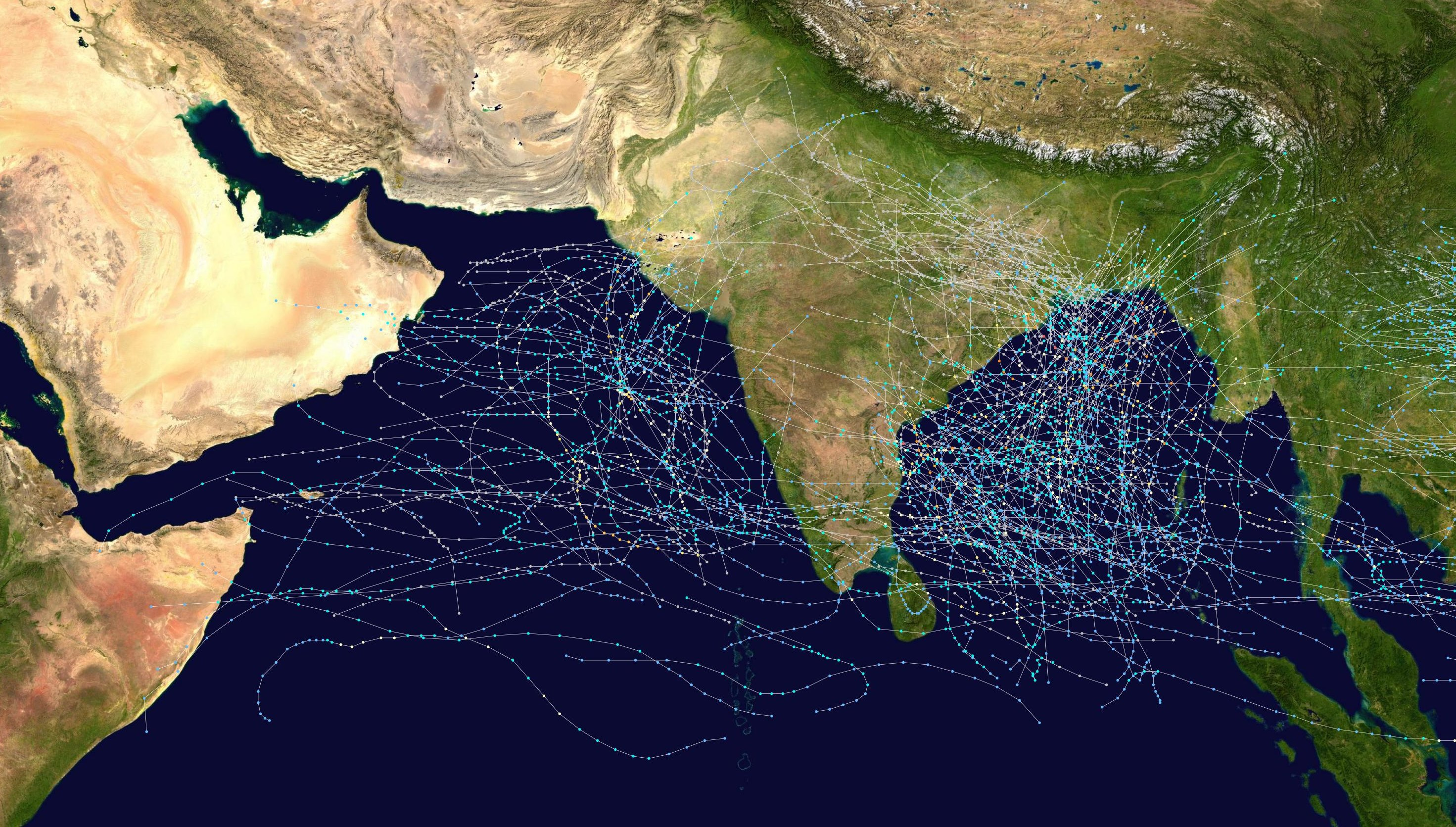
Cumulative track map of all North Indian Ocean cyclones from 1970 to 2005

In the Indian Ocean north of the equator, tropical cyclones can form throughout the year on either side of the Indian subcontinent, although most frequently between April and June, and between October and December.

The North Indian Ocean is the least active official basin, contributing only seven percent of the world's tropical cyclones. However the basin has produced some of the deadliest cyclones in the world, since they strike over very densely populated areas. The Regional Specialized Meteorological Centre (RSMC) is the India Meteorological Department (IMD) and it is responsible to monitor the basin, issues warning and name the storms.

== Sub-basins ==
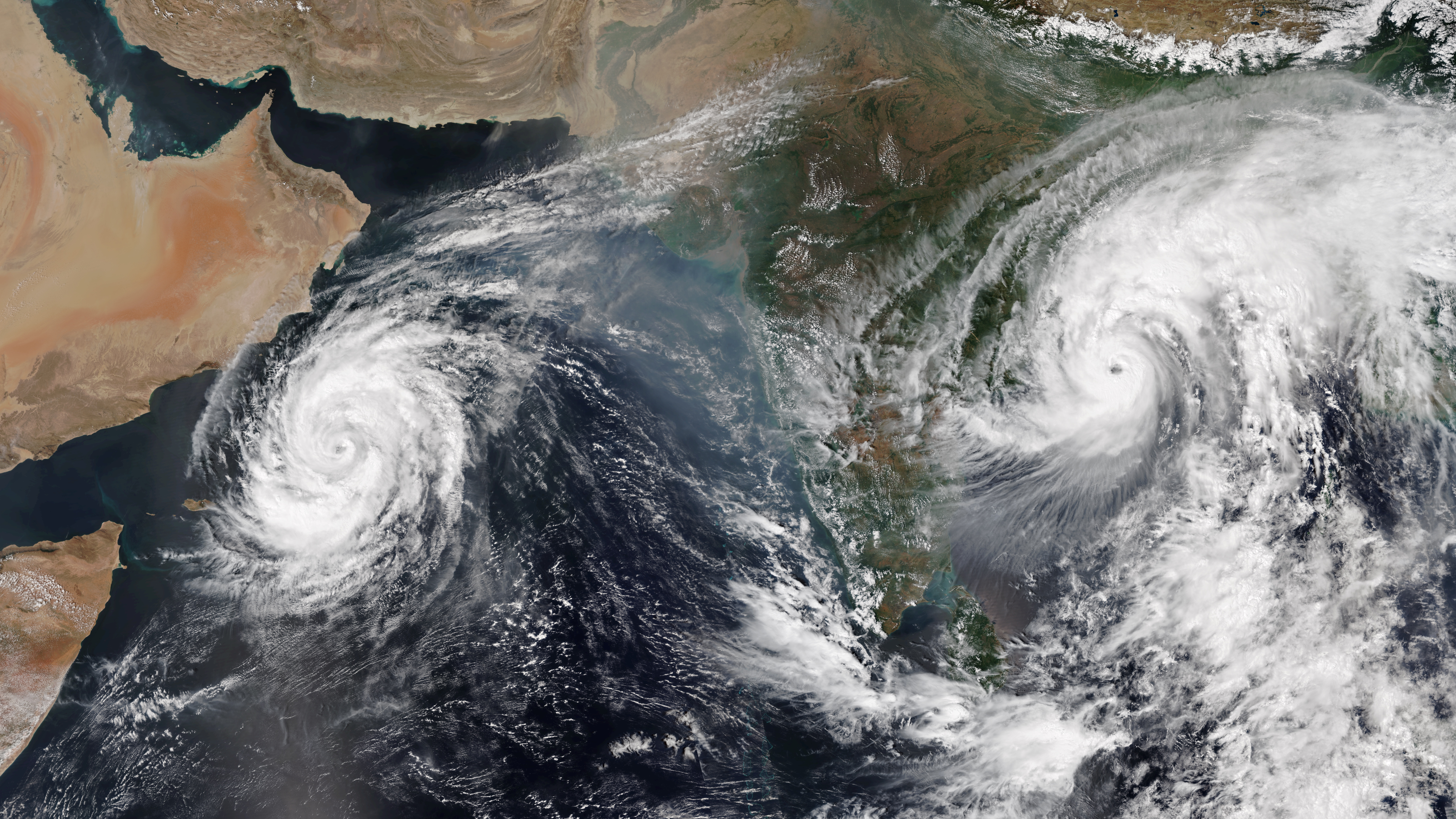
Very severe cyclonic storms Luban (left) and Titli (right) over the Arabian Sea and the Bay of Bengal in October 2018

The basin is divided into two sub-basins – the Bay of Bengal and the Arabian Sea.

The Bay of Bengal, located in the northeast of the Indian Ocean. The basin is abbreviated BOB by the India Meteorological Department (IMD). The United States's Joint Typhoon Warning Center unofficially designates as B to classify storms formed in the Bay of Bengal. The Bay of Bengal's coast is shared among India, Bangladesh, Myanmar, Sri Lanka and western part of Thailand. This sub-basin is the most active and produces some of the deadliest cyclones of all time. The most intense cyclone in the bay was the 1999 Odisha cyclone.

The Arabian Sea is a sea located in the northwest of the Indian Ocean. Tropical cyclones in the basin are abbreviated ARB by the India Meteorological Department (IMD). The United States's Joint Typhoon Warning Center unofficially designates as A to classify storms formed in the Arabian Sea. The Arabian Sea's coast is shared among Pakistan, India, Yemen, Oman, UAE, Iran, Sri Lanka, Maldives and Somalia. Monsoons are characteristic of the Arabian Sea and responsible for the yearly cycling of its waters. In summer, strong winds blow from the southwest to the northeast, bringing rain to the Indian subcontinent. Cyclones are less frequent in the Arabian Sea, but the basin can produce strong tropical cyclones. Cyclone Gonu was the strongest and the costliest recorded tropical cyclone in the basin.

== History of the basin ==
The systematic scientific studies of tropical systems in the Bay of Bengal and Arabian Sea was started during the 19th century by Henry Piddington. Piddington utilised meteorological logs of vessels that navigated the seas and published a series of memoirs, in the Journal of the Asiatic Society of Bengal between 1839 and 1858. These memoirs gave accounts and tracks of individual storms in the Bay of Bengal and the Arabian Sea.

During the 2004 post monsoon season the IMD started to name tropical cyclones within the basin, with the first one named Cyclone Onil during September 2004. During 2015 a modification to the intensity scale took place, with the IMD and WMO calling a system with 3-minute maximum sustained wind speeds between 90 knots (165 km/h; 105 mph) and 120 knots (220 km/h; 140 mph) an extremely severe cyclonic storm.

A study analysing the spring season of tropical cyclones in the Bay of Bengal found increases in both pre-monsoon precipitation and tropical cyclone intensity as a result of enhanced large-scale monsoon circulation after 1979. The deepened monsoon trough in the Bay of Bengal not only affects cyclone frequency and timing, but also acts to direct more cyclones towards Myanmar. Increased anthropogenic aerosols likely contributed to such a regional climate change.

== Climatology ==
=== Formation and frequency ===
On average only five to six tropical cyclones form in the basin each year. Tropical cyclones form in the months of March to June and October to December, with peaks at May and November. Most of these storms form in the Bay of Bengal: either in the southeastern Bay of Bengal, in the Andaman Sea, or as a remnant of a typhoon from the South China Sea, and a few in the Arabian Sea. High sea surface temperatures and humidity makes the bays more favourable to tropical cyclone development. There are many tropical cyclones in the West Pacific; this may be another reason for increased tropical cyclogenesis in the Bay, as it shares a fair portion of the increased quota of ACE. Meanwhile, the storms in the Arabian Sea mostly form over south-eastern part of the Arabian Sea or a remnant of a tropical cyclone from the Bay of Bengal, however the frequency of cyclogenesis in the Arabian Sea is generally less, due to cooler sea surface temperature and high wind shear. However a strong positive Indian Ocean Dipole may cause an increase of tropical cyclogenesis than usual which was seen in the 2019 season. Very few tropical cyclones develop in the months of June to September (Monsoon months) because of high vertical wind shear. These storms form in the Bay of Bengal and peak as depressions or deep depressions before making landfall in Odisha or West Bengal. Another reason is the low life span in the sea which also avoids the intensification of these low-pressure systems.

=== Movement ===
Most of the storms move in a north-westerly direction and starts curving either towards southwest or northeast. There's a higher frequency of recurving towards northeast rather going southwest. In the Arabian Sea these storms mostly move in north-westerly direction targeting the Arabian Peninsula, however in some case these storm moves north-eastwards after crossing the 15°N latitude and strikes the Gujarati coast. In the Bay of Bengal, storms generally moves north-westwards until reaching the east coast and then moves north-eastwards.

=== Intensification ===
Intensification probability is maximum in the months of April, May and November in case of a depression becoming a cyclonic storm and severe cyclonic storm. More than half of the depressions intensify into a storm and a quarter intensify into a cyclone in these months.

=== Landfall ===
In the Arabian Sea, most storms dissipate offshore without making landfall, but a significant number of tropical cyclones also impact the west coast, particularly the states of Gujarat and Maharashtra. The remaining 11 percent makes landfall in either the Arabian Peninsula, Horn of Africa or Pakistan. In rare cases, some storms make landfall in Iran, like Cyclone Gonu did in 2007. Other than Gonu, two storms: Cyclone Yemyin and Kyarr made some or major impact in Iran.

In the Bay of Bengal, most of the storms strikes either the Indian states of Odisha or West Bengal and a significant number of storms hit the states of Andhra Pradesh and Tamil Nadu. 30 percent of the cyclones strike the countries of Bangladesh, Sri Lanka and Myanmar while the remaining 13 percent just dissipates off shore without making landfall.

== Climate change ==
After a series of devastating cyclones in 2018, rising number of cyclones in the Arabian Sea in 2019 and a rising trend of rapid intensification in 2020 and 2021, many climatologists agree that climate change have caused these activities. On average, five cyclonic storms occur every year in the Arabian Sea. However, in 2019 eight cyclonic storms formed, becoming the record highest number of tropical cyclones in the sub-basin, which was tied with the 1902 season. Research has found that in recent decades the sea surface temperatures has risen up by 1.2–1.4 °C (2.2–2.5 °F) in the Arabian Sea. During Cyclone Amphan’s rapid intensification, sea surface temperatures were as high as 33 °C (91 °F) in the Bay of Bengal, and parts of the Arabian Sea reached 32 °C (90 °F) before the formation of Cyclone Nisarga. According to the Union Ministry of Earth and Science, the frequency of very severe cyclonic storms has risen up by one per decade in last two decades, despite the decrease of the overall tropical cyclone frequency in the same period. Higher temperatures caused the cyclones to become more powerful and lead to tropical cyclone formation faster. Rising sea level also caused higher storm surge. Researchers also predict that cyclones will be deadlier and stronger as the trend of warming sea surface temperatures continue. Rising sea levels also may cause severe flooding, strong storm surge and inundation of coastal towns.

== Seasons ==
Historical storm formation by month between 1990 and 2020
- Super Cyclone
- Extremely Severe
- Very Severe
- Severe
- Cyclonic Storm
- Deep Depression
- Depression

=== 1890s ===
Year	D	CS	SCS	Notes
1890	10	4	1	
1891	13	4	3	Total includes 1 Land Severe Cyclonic Storm
1892	12	7	2	
1893	12	10	4	
1894	12	6	0	
1895	11	5	4	
1896	10	8	3	
1897	12	6	8	
1898	13	7	3	
1899	7	3	0	
Total	112	60	28	

=== 1900s ===
Year	D	CS	SCS	Strongest storm	Deaths	Damage (USD)	Notes
1900	10	3	1				
1901	6	3	2				
1902	13	7	5				
1903	14	8	2				
1904	9	4	0				
1905	10	6	0				
1906	11	7	1				
1907	15	8	4				
1908	9	6	1				
1909	8	8	4				
Total	105	60	20				

=== 1910s ===
Year	D	CS	SCS	Strongest storm	Deaths	Damage (USD)	Notes
1910	6	5	2				
1911	7	5	4				
1912	9	6	2				
1913	10	6	2				
1914	8	4	2				
1915	9	6	0				
1916	14	8	5				
1917	10	3	1				
1918	11	5	0				
1919	11	6	3				
Total	95	54	21				

=== 1920s ===
Year	D	CS	SCS	Strongest storm	Deaths	Damage (USD)	Notes
1920	9	5	0				
1921	10	4	1				
1922	13	6	6				
1923	16	4	3				
1924	13	6	0				
1925	20	7	3				
1926	13	10	3				
1927	18	7	2				
1928	13	7	0				
1929	15	6	0				
Total	140	62	18				

=== 1930s ===
Year	D	CS	SCS	Strongest storm	Deaths	Damage (USD)	Notes
1930	14	10	1				
1931	11	5	1				
1932	14	6	2				
1933	16	8	3				
1934	16	5	0				
1935	15	6	2				
1936	18	6	3	VSCS Two	293	$75,000	
1937	19	6	2				
1938	10	4	4				
1939	19	7	3				
Total	152	63	21				

=== 1940s ===
Year	D	CS	SCS	Strongest storm	Deaths	Damage (USD)	Notes
1940	16	8	5				
1941	19	8	4				
1942	14	5	2				
1943	14	7	1				
1944	19	8	2				
1945	15	3	2				
1946	17	5	1				
1947	18	4	2				
1948	18	6	3				
1949	12	1	1				
Total	162	55	23				

=== 1950s ===
Year	D	CS	SCS	Strongest storm	Deaths	Damage (USD)	Notes
1950	16	4	0	SCS Sixteen	Unknown	Unknown	
1951	15	4	2	SCS Fifteen	Unknown	Unknown	
1952	17	4	2				
1953	10	1	1				
1954	14	1	0				
1955	13	6	2				
1956	14	4	2				
1957	7	4	2				
1958	12	5	2				
1959	16	6	3				
Total	134	39	16		Unknown	Unknown	

=== 1960s ===
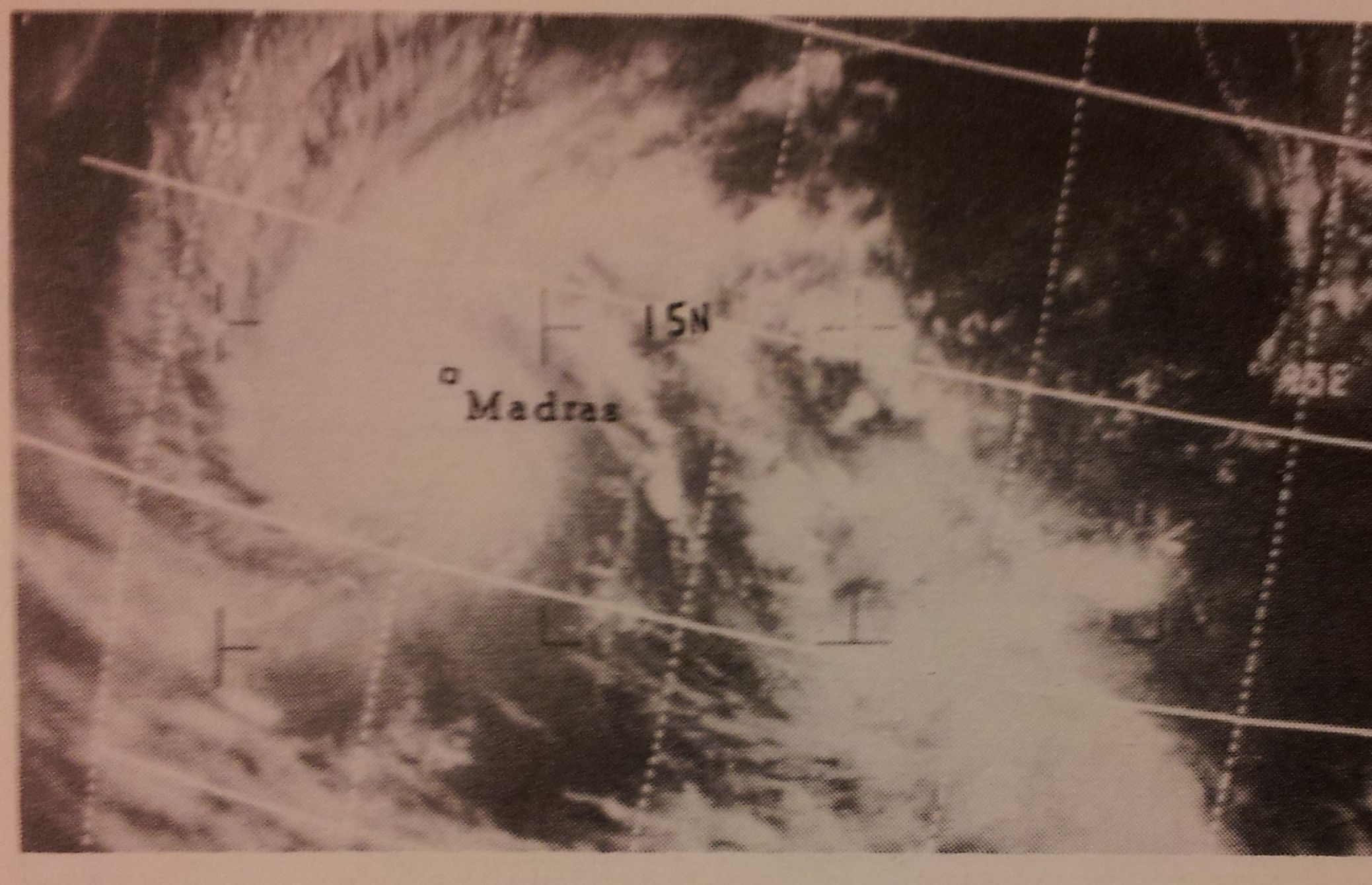
This ESSA 3 satellite image was taken on November 3, 1966, at 0819 UTC of a tropical cyclone striking Madras, India

Year	D	CS	SCS	Strongest storm	Deaths	Damage (USD)	Notes
1960	15	5	3	VSCS Ten	20,299	>$9.4 million	Vast majority of the fatalities resulted from two cyclones striking East Pakistan three weeks apart
1961	18	5	4	SCS Winnie	11,525	Unknown	Three land depressions developed this season
1962	13	5	3	VSCS Twelve	≥50,769	$34.5 million	Deadliest storm, Harriet, crossed over from the Western Pacific
1963	17	6	4	SuCS Three	11,735	Unknown	
1964	16	7	5	SuCS "Rameswaram"	>1,827	>$150 million	
1965	14	6	4				
1966	18	8	6				
1967	15	6	4				
1968	13	7	4	SuCS "Burma"			
1969	14	6	1	ESCS Twelve			
Total	153	61	38	Three	>47,000	>$193.9 million	

=== 1970s ===
Year	D	CS	SCS	Strongest storm	Deaths	Damage (USD)	Notes
1970	15	7	3	ESCS "Bhola"	300,000-500,000	86.4 million	The Bhola cyclone is the deadliest tropical cyclone recorded worldwide
1971	15	7	6	ESCS "Odisha"			
1972	18	7	6	ESCS 09B			
1973	16	6	3	SCS 14B			
1974	12	7	3	VSCS 06B			
1975	20	7	4	ESCS 02A			
1976	14	10	7	ESCS 02A			
1977	18	5	5	SuCS "Andhra Pradesh"	up to 50,000	$192 million	Devastated Krishna Delta area in Andhra Pradesh
1978	14	5	3	SuCS "Sri Lanka"	1,000+		
1979	11	5	4	ESCS 01B			
Total	153	66	44	"Andhra Pradesh"	>800,000	>$278.4 million	

=== 1980s ===
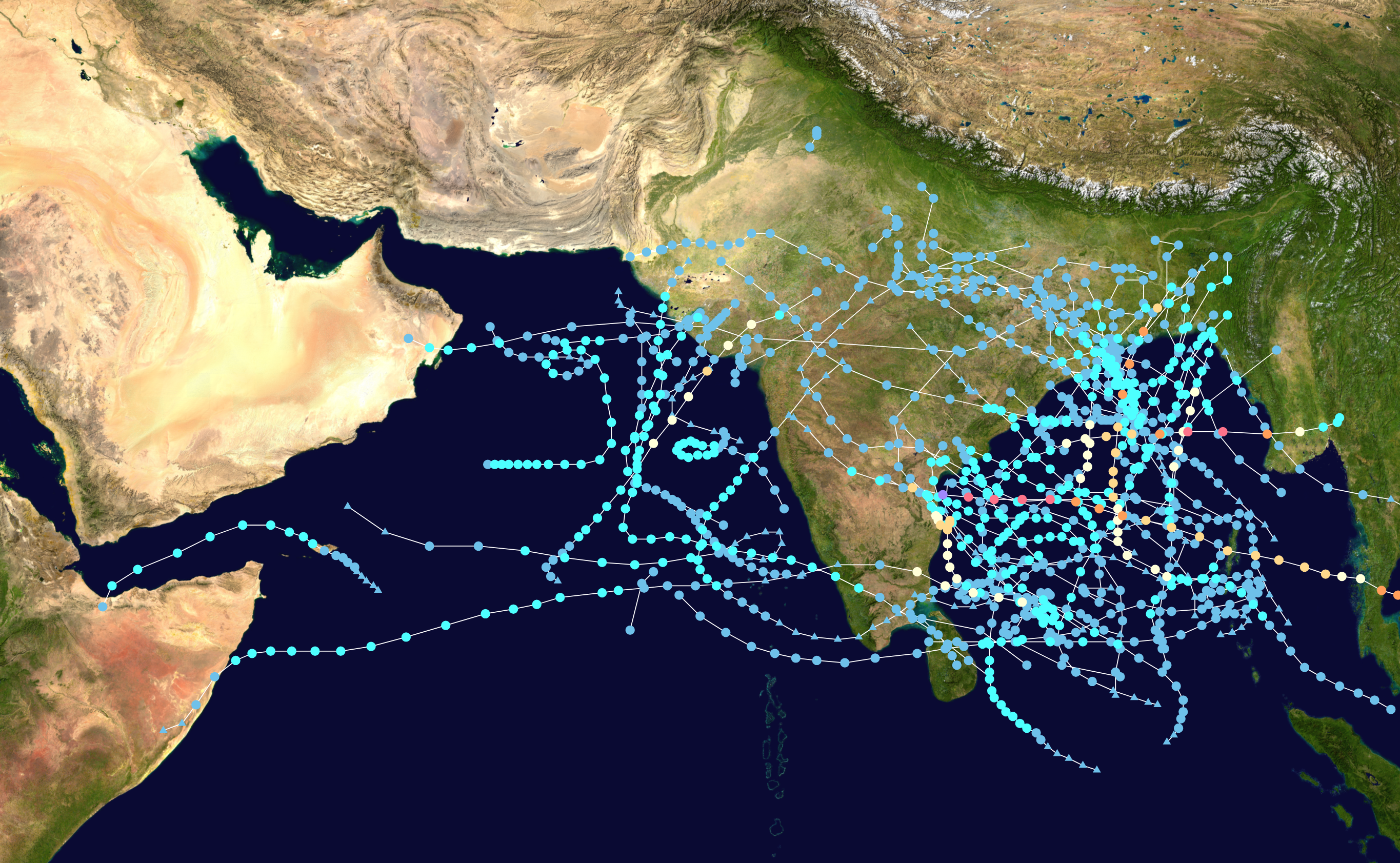
Tracks of all North Indian Ocean cyclones from 1980-1989.

Year	D	DD	CS	SCS	VSCS	ESCS	SuCS	Strongest storm	Deaths	Damages (USD)	Notes
1980	14	14	5	0	0	0	0	CS BOB 02			
1981	12	12	5	3	3	0	0	VSCS BOB 03			
1982	19	11	8	5	3	3	0	ESCS BOB 01			
1983	7	4	2	1	1	1	0	CS Herbert			
1984	7	7	4	3	3	2	0	ESCS "Sriharikota"	430		
1985	15	15	6	1	1	0	0	VSCS "Bangladesh"	11,107		
1986	8	3	1	0	0	0	0	CS 02B	11		
1987	9	8	5	3	1	0	0	VSCS 01B			
1988	9	5	5	3	2	2	0	ESCS "Bangladesh"	6,740	$13 million	
1989	10	5	3	2	1	1	1	SuCS Gay	1,785	$25.27 million	Typhoon Gay crossed over from the West Pacific Basin
Total	110	84	44	21	15	9	1	Gay / Kavali	>20,073	>$38.27 billion	

=== 1990s ===
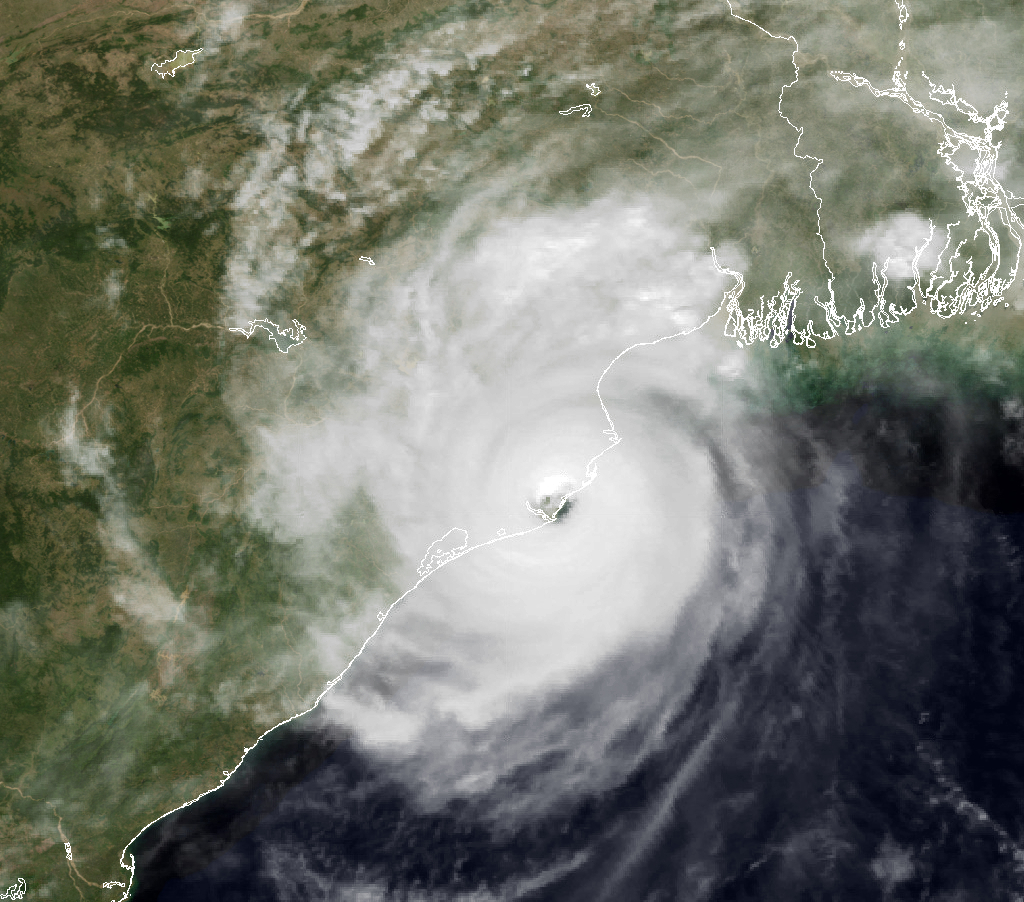
The 1999 Odisha Cyclone making landfall over Odisha in 1999.

Year	D	DD	CS	SCS	VSCS	ESCS	SuCS	Strongest storm	Deaths	Damage (USD)	Notes and References
1990	11	6	2	2	1	1	1	SuCS "Andhra Pradesh"	967	$600 million	
1991	9	4	3	1	1	1	1	SuCS "Bangladesh"	>138,000	$1.5 billion	
1992	13	11	7	2	1	1	0	ESCS Forrest	189	$69 million	Forrest crossed over from the West Pacific Basin
1993	5	4	2	2	2	0	0	ESCS BOB 02	714	$216 million	
1994	5	5	4	2	2	1	0	ESCS "Bangladesh"	315	$12.5 million	
1995	8	6	3	2	2	1	0	ESCS BOB 07	554	$46.3 million	
1996	10	8	6	4	2	0	0	VSCS "Andhra Pradesh"	2,075	$1.9 billion	
1997	9	7	3	2	1	1	0	ESCS "Bangladesh"	117	Unknown	
1998	12	10	6	5	3	1	0	ESCS "Gujarat"	>10,212	$3 billion	
1999	10	8	5	3	3	2	1	SuCS "Odisha"	15,780	$5 billion	The Odisha cyclone is the strongest cyclone recorded in the Northern Indian Ocean.
Total	93	69	41	25	18	9	3	"Odisha"	>168,923	~$12.35 billion	

=== 2000s ===
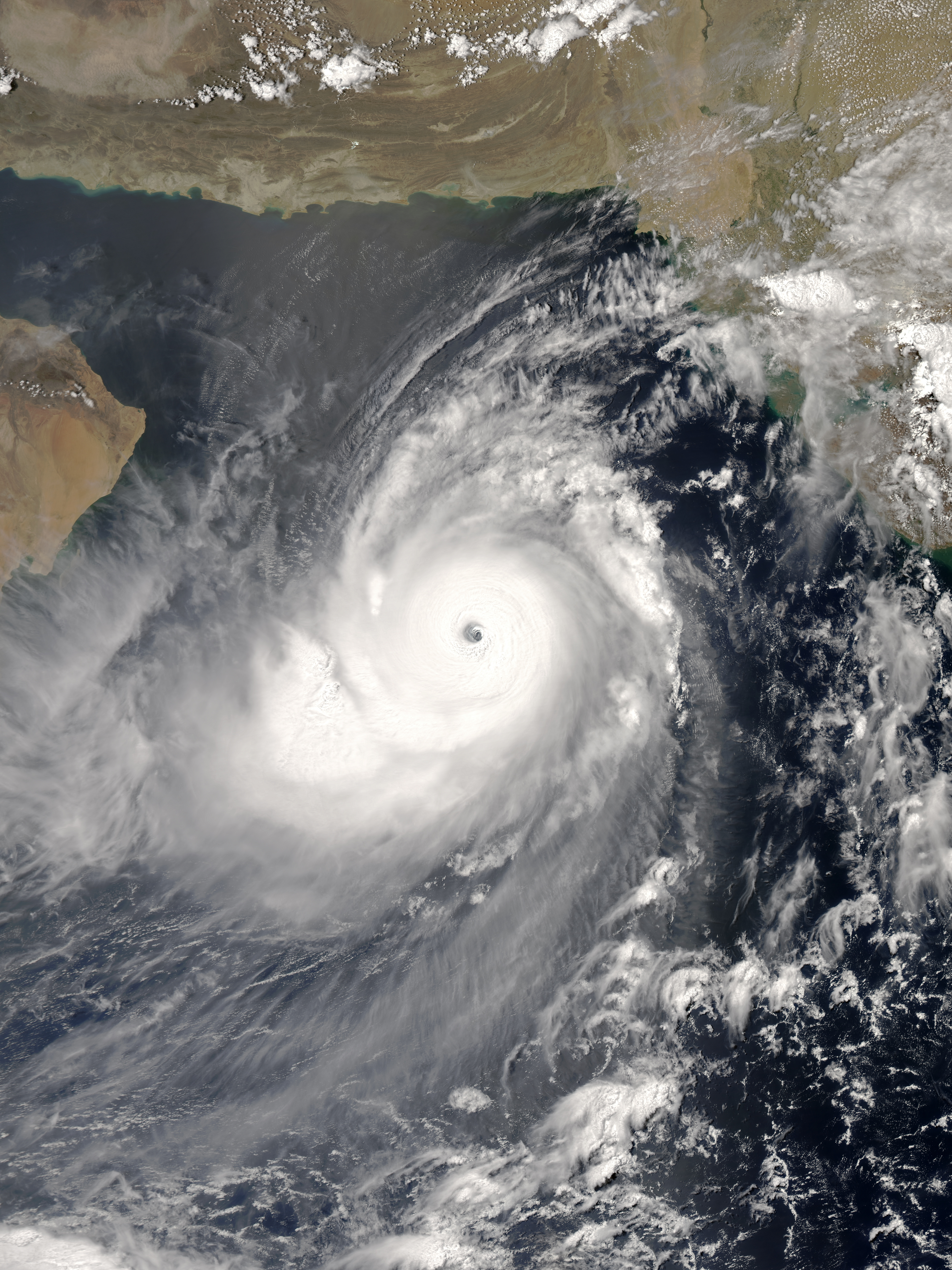
Cyclone Gonu at its peak in 2007.

Year	D	DD	CS	SCS	VSCS	ESCS	SuCS	Strongest storm	Deaths	Damage (USD)	Notes
2000	7	6	5	2	2	2	0	ESCS "South India"	238	$185 million	
2001	6	5	4	1	1	1	0	ESCS "Gujarat"	108	$104 million	
2002	7	7	4	1	0	0	0	SCS "West Bengal"	182	$25 million	
2003	7	5	3	3	1	0	0	VSCS "Sri Lanka"	358	$163 million	
2004	10	7	4	4	1	1	0	ESCS "Myanmar"	587	$130 million	
2005	12	7	3	0	0	0	0	CS Pyarr	273	$21.4 million	
2006	12	6	3	2	1	1	0	ESCS Mala	623	$6.7 million	
2007	11	8	4	2	2	2	1	SuCS Gonu	16,248	$6.4 billion	
2008	10	7	4	1	1	1	0	ESCS Nargis	>138,927	$15.4 billion	The deadliest cyclone season since 1970; Third-costliest cyclone season on record
2009	8	6	4	1	0	0	0	SCS Aila	421	$618 million	
Total	90	64	38	17	9	8	1	Gonu	>157,965	$16.65 billion	

=== 2010s ===
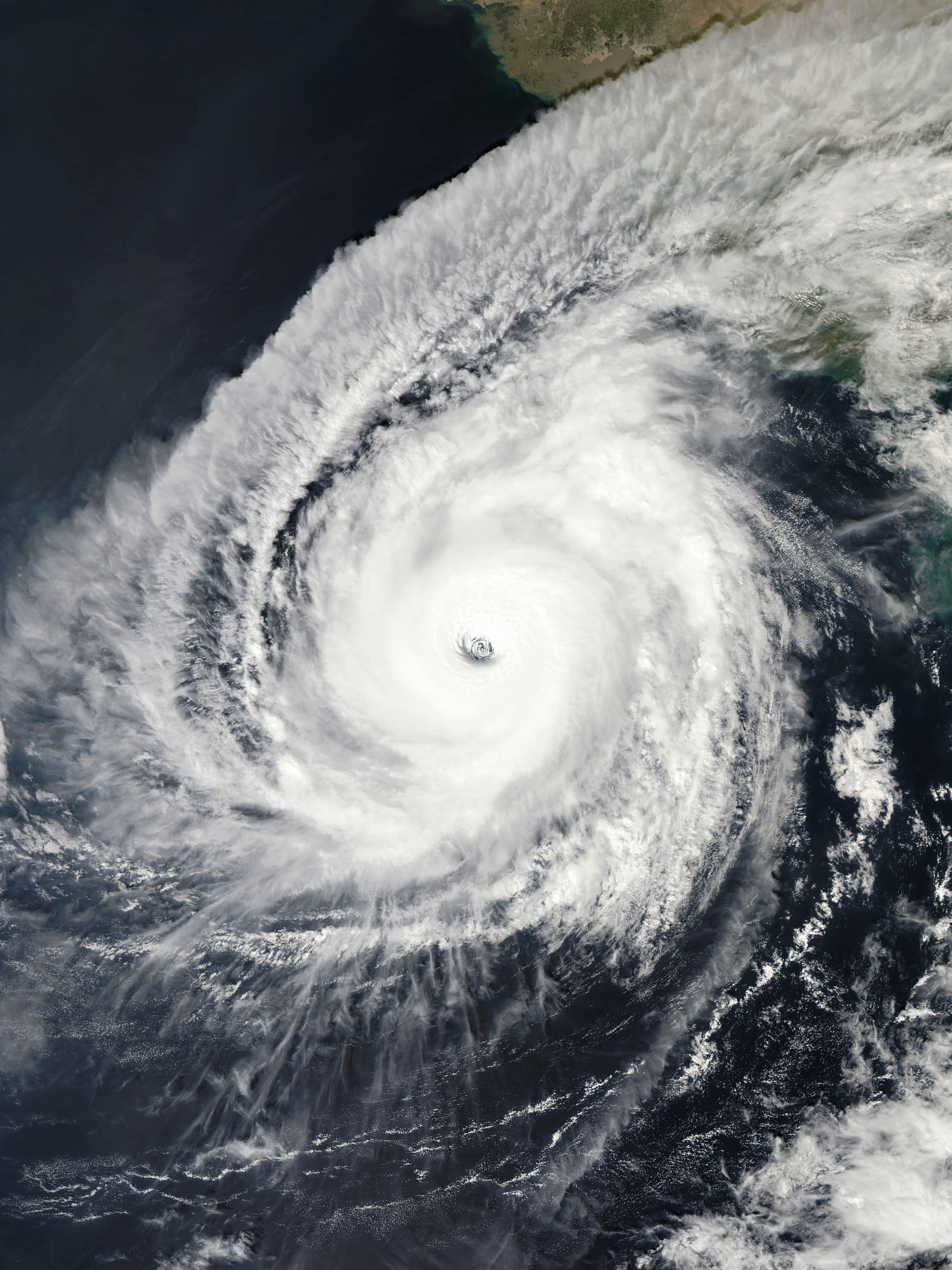
Cyclone Kyarr was the first super cyclone since 2007.

Year	D	DD	CS	SCS	VSCS	ESCS	SuCS	Strongest storm	Deaths	Damages (USD)	Notes
2010	8	6	5	4	2	1	0	ESCS Giri	402	$2.99 billion	The most active season since 1998
2011	10	6	2	1	1	0	0	VSCS Thane	360	$277 million	The first cyclonic storm didn't develop until November 2.
2012	5	5	2	0	0	0	0	CS Nilam	128	$56.7 million	The first depression of the year did not develop until October 10
2013	10	6	5	4	3	1	0	ESCS Phailin	323	$1.5 billion	Featured Phailin, the first Category 5-equivalent cyclone since Sidr in 2007
2014	8	5	3	2	2	2	0	ESCS Nilofar	183	$3.4 billion	
2015	12	9	4	2	2	2	0	ESCS Chapala	363	$358 million	First season on record with two cyclones producing hurricane-force winds in Socotra
2016	10	5	4	1	1	0	0	VSCS Vardah	401	$5.4 billion	
2017	10	6	3	2	1	0	0	VSCS Ockhi	834	$3.65 billion	
2018	14	9	7	5	3	1	0	ESCS Mekunu	343	$4.33 billion	The most active season since 1992
2019	12	11	8	6	6	3	1	SuCS Kyarr	173	$11.5 billion	Earliest cyclonic storm in the basin First Super Cyclonic Storm since 2007
Total	99	68	43	27	21	10	1	Kyarr	3510	≥$33.5 billion	

=== 2020s ===
Year	D	DD	CS	SCS	VSCS	ESCS	SuCS	Strongest storm	Deaths	Damages (USD)	Notes
2020	9	6	5	4	3	1	1	SuCS Amphan	280	$18.1 billion	First super cyclonic storm in the Bay of Bengal since 1999; Featured one of the costliest cyclones ever recorded in the basin, Amphan; Second-costliest North Indian cyclone season on record
2021	10	6	5	3	2	1	0	ESCS Tauktae	273	$6.08 billion	
2022	15	7	3	2	0	0	0	SCS Asani	79	$471.2 million	First season on record to have two depressions forming in the month of March
2023	10	8	7	5	4	3	0	ESCS Mocha	514	$4.07 billion	Mocha was one of the strongest cyclones ever formed in the basin's history.
2024	12	7	4	2	0	0	0	SCS Remal	590	$2.35 billion	
2025	14	6	4	2	0	0	0	SCS Shakhti	2,912	$22.28 billion	The first cyclonic storm didn't develop until October 3. Deadliest North Indian Ocean cyclone season since 2008; Featured Senyar, one of only two tropical cyclones on record to exist in the Malacca Strait, as well as the costliest cyclone in the basin on record. Costliest North Indian cyclone season on record
2026	8	5	1	0	0	0	0	VSCS Arnab	0	Unknown	Earliest date for first storm forming since 2019. The first cyclonic storm didn't develop until October 26. First Very Severe Cyclonic Storm in the basin since Cyclone Hamoon in 2023.
Total	63	36	24	16	9	5	1	Amphan	4,648	$53.38 billion	

== Records ==
- The most intense tropical cyclone of the basin was the 1999 Odisha Cyclone. It was the strongest tropical cyclone to hit the Indian state of Odisha. The maximum recorded wind speed was 260 km/h (160 mph) with minimum barometric pressure of 912 mbar (26.93 inHg).
- The costliest tropical cyclone in the Indian Ocean Basin was Cyclone Senyar, which struck the Malay Peninsula and Sumatra on 27 November 2025. The recorded damage cost was US$19.8 billion beating the previous record of 2020's Cyclone Amphan which caused US$15.5 billion.
- The deadliest tropical cyclone was the 1970 Bhola Cyclone, which caused over 500,000 fatalities in the Ganges-Brahmaputra delta region alone. It made landfall in the Tazumuddin Upazila in East Pakistan (now known as Bangladesh).
- The smallest tropical cyclone was Cyclone Ogni, which struck the Andhra Pradesh coast on October 30, 2006. The cyclone's diameter was only 100 km (62 mi).
- The largest tropical cyclone was the 1999 Odisha Cyclone, which struck the coast of Odisha.
- The wettest tropical cyclone was Severe Cyclonic Storm ARB 01 (2004). One of the weather stations recorded 184 cm (72 in) between May 5 – 7, 2004.

== See also ==
- Tropical cyclone
- Atlantic hurricane season
- Pacific hurricane season
- Pacific typhoon season
- South-West Indian Ocean tropical cyclone
- Australian region tropical cyclone
- South Pacific tropical cyclone
- South Atlantic tropical cyclone
- Mediterranean tropical-like cyclone
