= Indian languages =

Indian languages or Indian language may refer to:

- Languages of India, referring to the many languages spoken in India
- Languages of the Indian subcontinent, more broadly, i.e., South Asia
- Indo-Aryan languages or Indic languages, a branch of Indo-European predominantly spoken in the Indian subcontinent
- Hindustani language (lit. 'Indian language', Hindustan + -i) or Hindi–Urdu, an Indo-Aryan language with Hindi and Urdu as standard registers
- Hindi language (lit. 'Indian language', Hind + -i), an Indo-Aryan language spoken in northern India
- Indigenous languages of the Americas, languages of the American Indians

== See also ==
- Indic languages (disambiguation)
- Indian linguistics (disambiguation)
- Indo-European languages, a language family native to Europe, the Iranian Plateau, and South Asia
