= Indian linguistics =

For articles related to Indian linguistics see:

- the languages of India, or more broadly, the languages of South Asia
- Vyākaraṇa, the ancient Indian school of grammar
- any of the other related Indian disciplines of Nirukta (etymology), Shiksha (phonetics and phonology), Chandas (meter)

== See also ==
- Indian languages (disambiguation)
