= 1962 North Indian Ocean cyclone season =

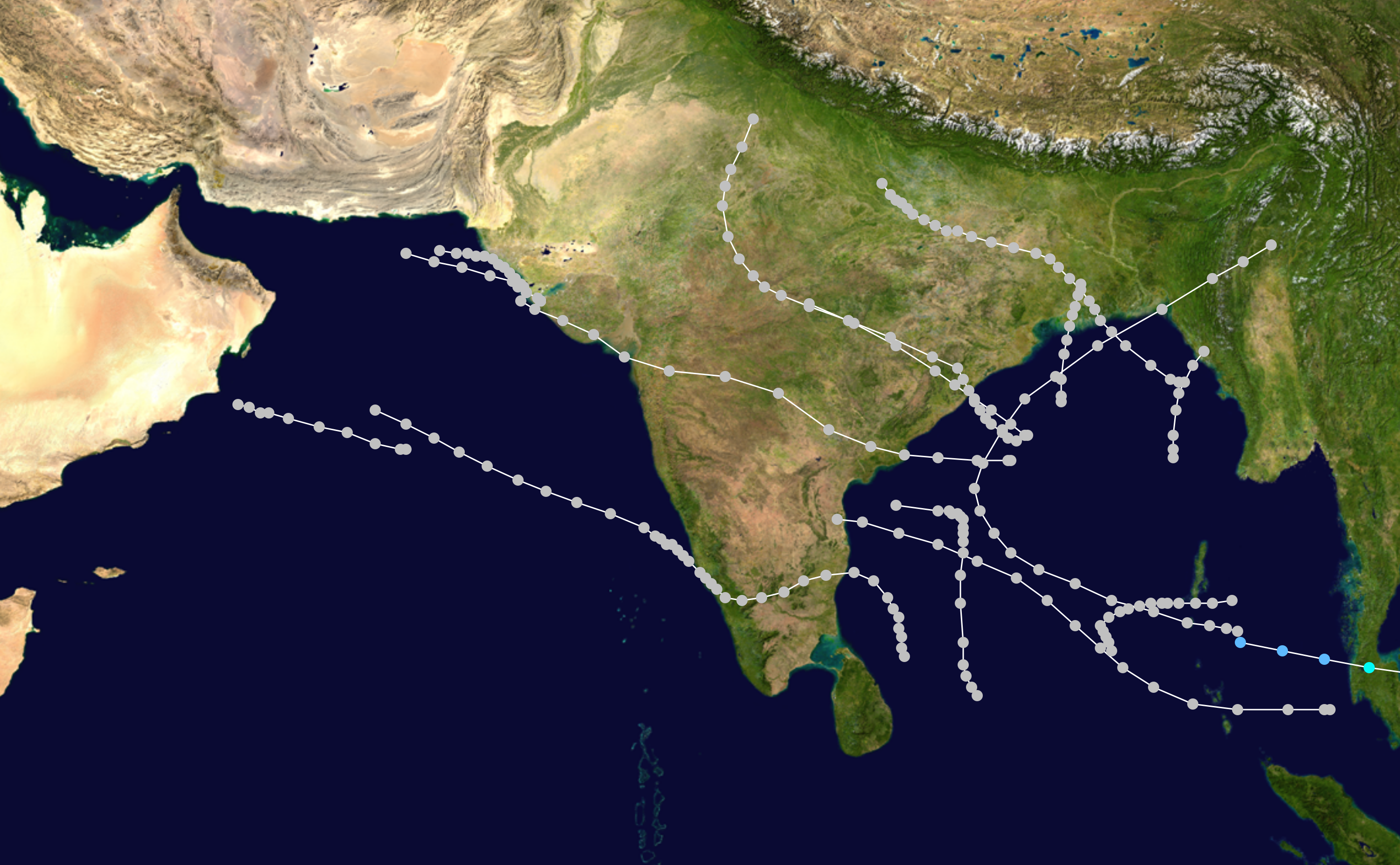
- Season summary map

Seasonal boundaries
- First system formed: May 15, 1962
- Last system dissipated: December 13, 1962

Strongest storm
- Name: Twelve
  - Maximum winds: 140 km/h (85 mph) (3-minute sustained)
  - Lowest pressure: 974 hPa (mbar)

Seasonal statistics
- Depressions: 13
- Deep depressions: 10
- Cyclonic storms: 5
- Very severe cyclonic storms: 1
- Total fatalities: ≥50,769 total, 142 missing
- Total damage: ≥ $34.5 million (1962 USD)

Related articles
- 1962 Atlantic hurricane season; 1962 Pacific hurricane season; 1962 Pacific typhoon season

The 1962 North Indian Ocean cyclone season had no official bounds, but cyclones tend to form between April and December. These dates conventionally delimit the period of each year when most tropical cyclones form in the northern Indian Ocean. There are two main seas in the North Indian Ocean—the Bay of Bengal to the east of the Indian subcontinent and the Arabian Sea to the west of India. The official Regional Specialized Meteorological Centre in this basin is the India Meteorological Department (IMD), while the Joint Typhoon Warning Center releases unofficial advisories. An average of four to six storms form in the North Indian Ocean every season with peaks in May and November. The IMD includes cyclones occurring between the meridians 45°E and 100°E in the season.

== Season summary ==
The 1962 North Indian Ocean cyclone season was a fairly active season that included 13 depressions, 10 deep depressions, 5 cyclonic storms, and 1 severe cyclonic storm. The first storm of the season was Cyclonic Storm One in early May. May was active, having three storms including the aforementioned One, Deep Depression Two, and Depression Three. June had Depression Four, while Deep Depression Five and Depression Six coexisted in early July. August had no storms, while two Deep Depressions Seven and Eight and Cyclonic Storm Nine occurred in September. Deep Depression Ten formed in late October, and Severe Cyclonic Storm Harriet crossed over from the Western Pacific at around the same time. Harriet caused the only recorded deaths and damages in this season, with approximately 50,769 killed and over $34.5 million in damages. The strongest storm of the season, Very Severe Cyclonic Storm Twelve, formed in late November and affected India. The last storm of the season, Severe Cyclonic Storm Thirteen, took an unusual track in late December.

== Systems ==
=== Cyclonic Storm One ===
- Cyclonic storm (IMD)
- Tropical storm (SSHWS)
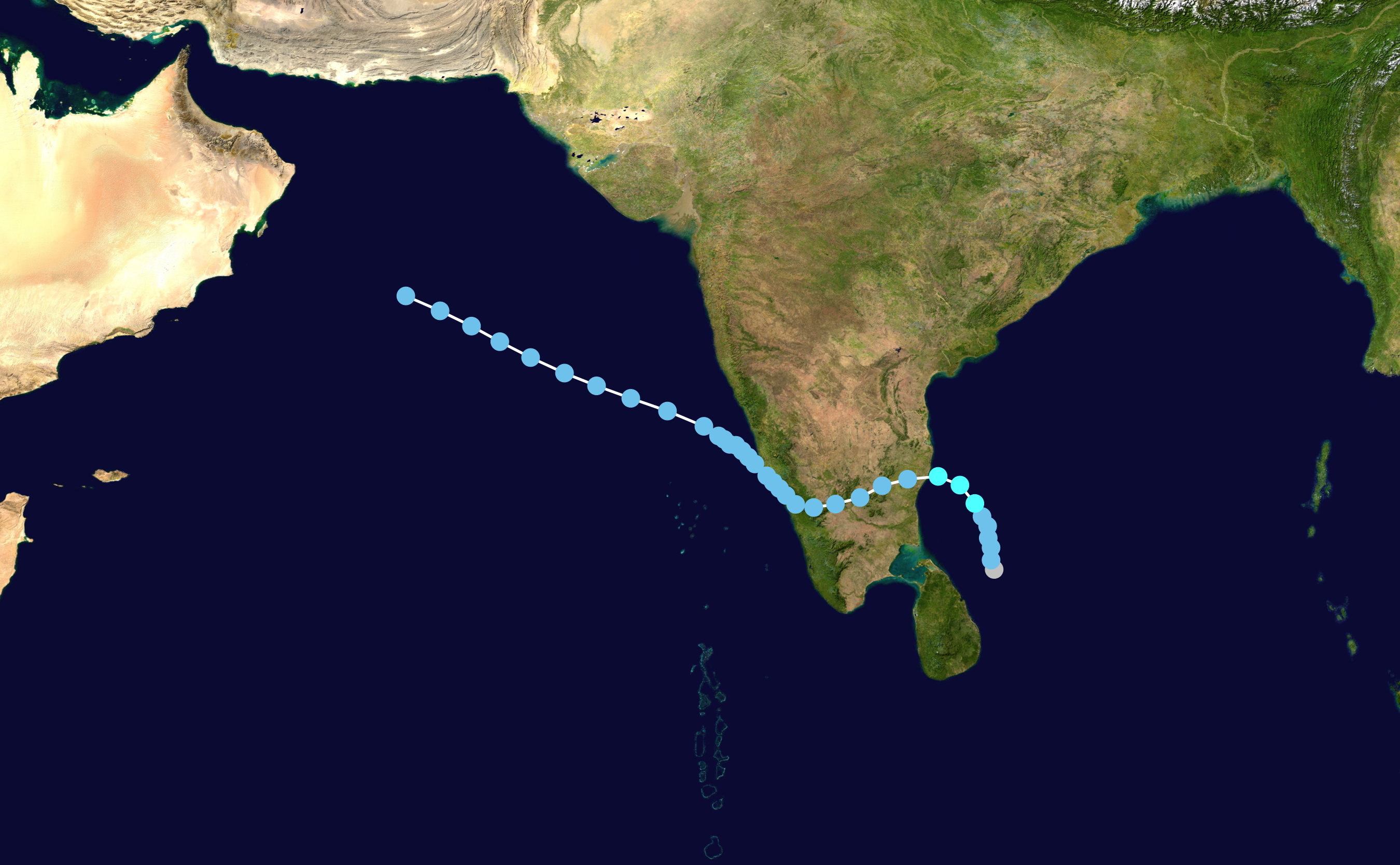
- Duration: May 14 – May 22
- Peak intensity: 75 km/h (45 mph) (3-min); 994 hPa (mbar)

Cyclonic Storm One existed from May 14 to May 22. The storm moved from east to west, forming on May 14 and slowly moving northward. On May 15, it started moving northwestward, then later westward as it strengthened. It made a landfall on northern Tamil Nadu, moving west-southwestward with 1-minute sustained winds of 40 miles per hour on May 16 after strengthening into a low-end tropical storm-strength tropical cyclone. It then crossed India and resurfaced in the Arabian Sea early on May 18, also turning northwest in the meantime. The storm spent the rest of its lifetime slowly moving northwest as a tropical depression, eventually dissipating on May 22 a few hundred kilometers south of Pakistan.

=== Deep Depression Two ===
- Deep depression (IMD)
- Tropical depression (SSHWS)
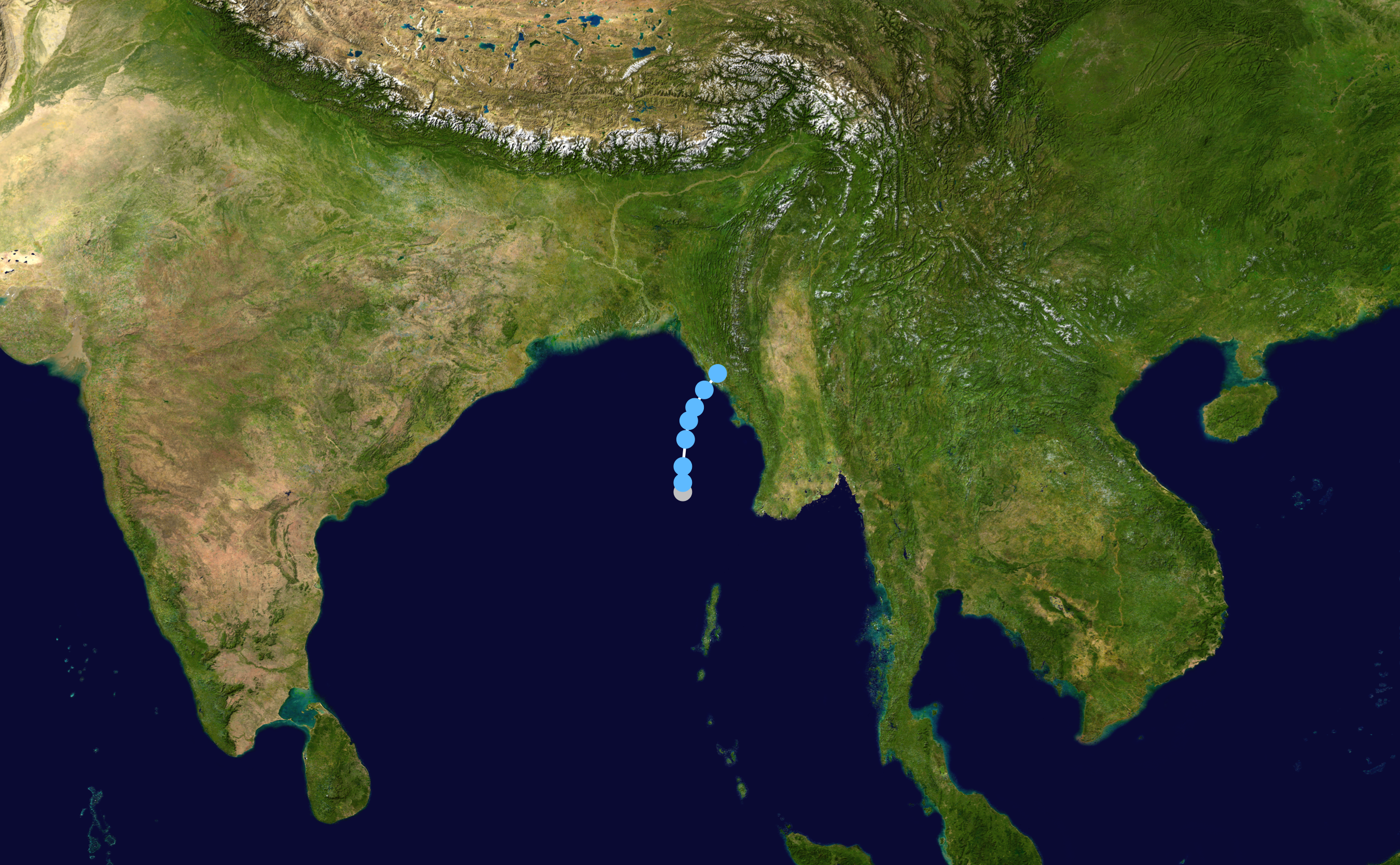
- Duration: May 24 – May 25
- Peak intensity: 30 km/h (15 mph) (3-min); 992 hPa (mbar)

Deep Depression Two existed from May 24 to May 25. The storm moved from south to north throughout its two-day lifetime. It first formed early on May 24 moving northward in the northeast Bay of Bengal, then started moving northeastward later in the day. The storm made a tropical depression-strength landfall on western Myanmar on May 25 and quickly dissipated afterward.

=== Depression Three ===
- Depression (IMD)
- Tropical depression (SSHWS)
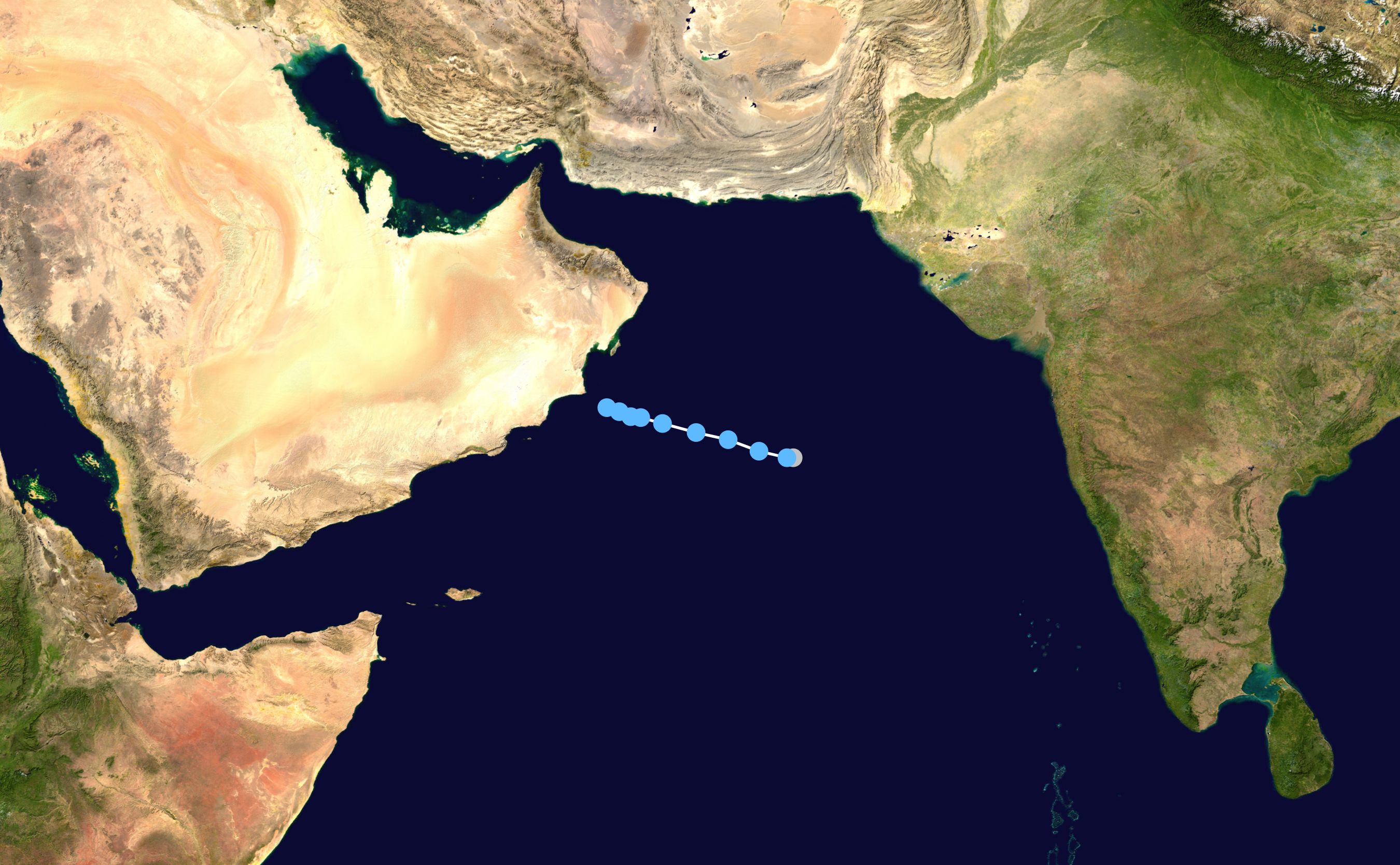
- Duration: May 28 – May 30
- Peak intensity: 35 km/h (25 mph) (3-min);

Depression Three existed from May 28 to May 30. The tropical depression moved from east to west, forming early on May 28 in the middle of the Arabian Sea, moving west-northwestward throughout its entire lifetime. After maintaining its intensity for two days, the storm dissipated a few miles off the east coast of Oman. The storm was a tropical depression-equivalent storm at peak intensity, with 1-minute sustained winds of 30 miles per hour or 45 kilometers per hour.

=== Depression Four ===
- Depression (IMD)
- Tropical depression (SSHWS)
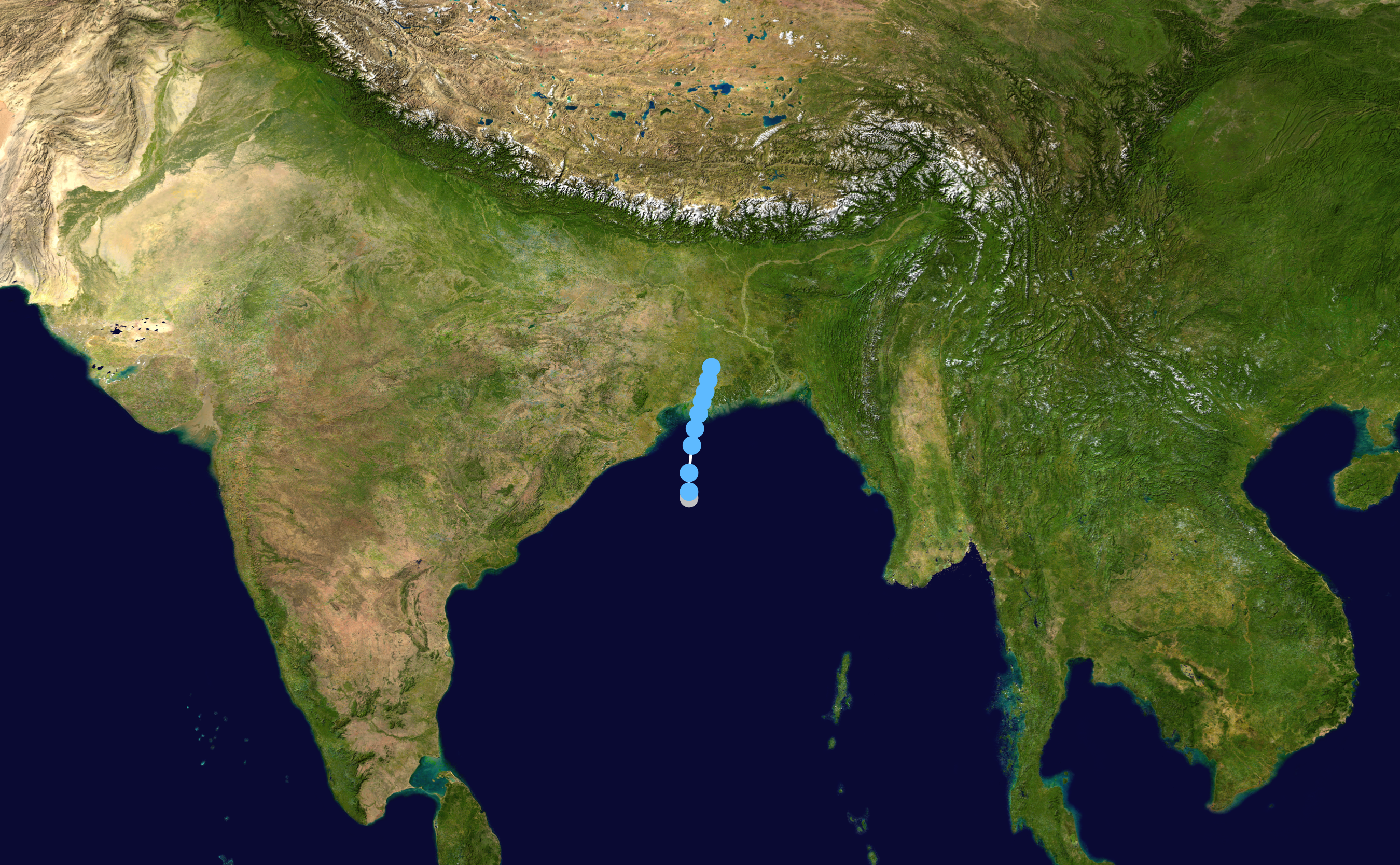
- Duration: June 6 – June 8
- Peak intensity: 45 km/h (30 mph) (1-min);

Depression Four existed from June 6 to June 8. The storm moved from south to north throughout its two-day lifetime, forming early on June 6 moving northward in the northern Bay of Bengal and turning north-northwestward later that day. it maintained its intensity for one day, then made a tropical depression-strength landfall on southern East Pakistan which caused its dissipation less than six hours later.

=== Deep Depression Five ===
- Deep depression (IMD)
- Tropical depression (SSHWS)
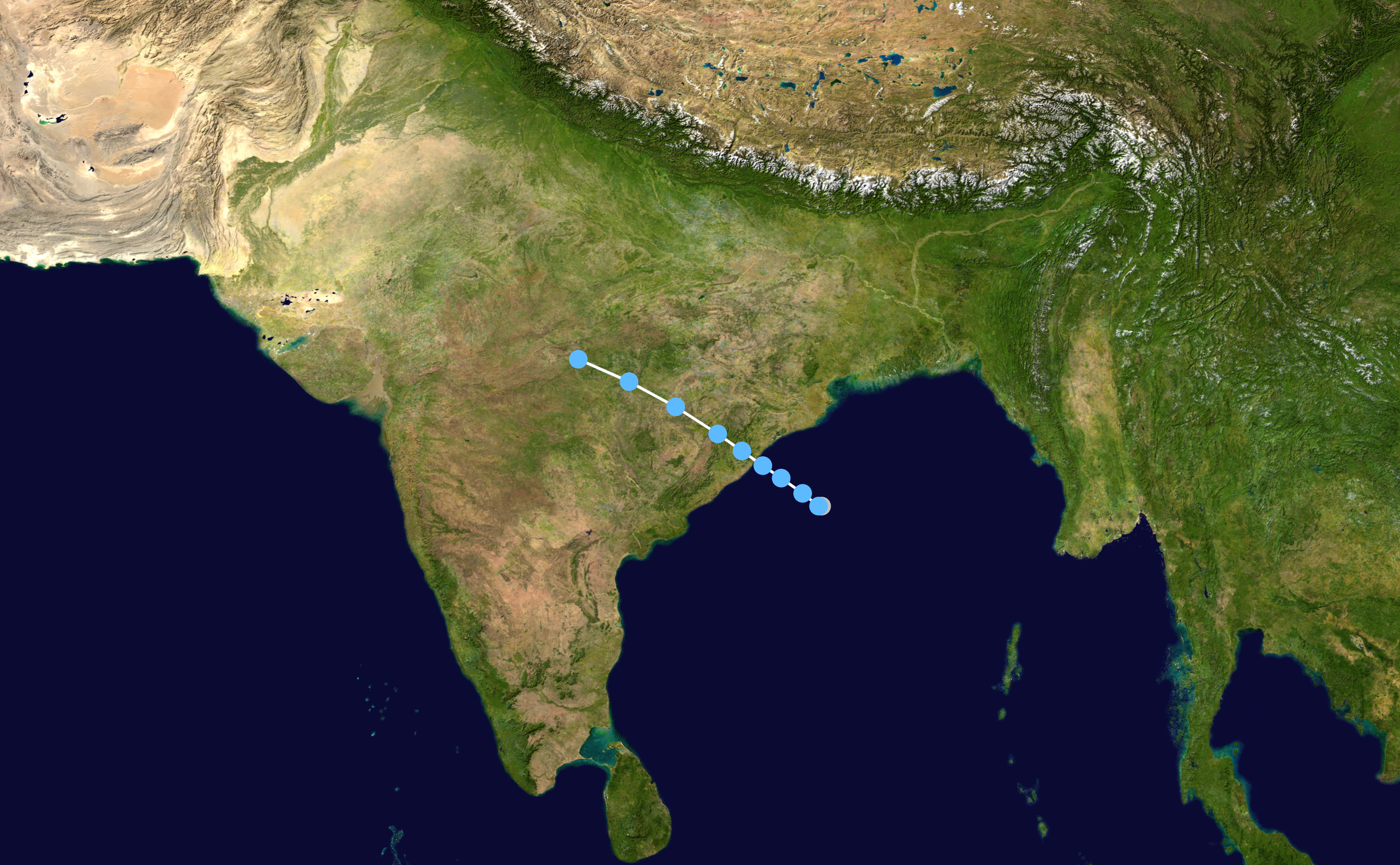
- Duration: July 11 – July 13
- Peak intensity: 55 km/h (35 mph) (3-min); 982 hPa (mbar)

Deep Depression Five existed from July 11 to July 13. It formed on July 11 as a tropical depression, moving west-northwestward in the northern Bay of Bengal. It made landfall on extreme northeast Andhra Pradesh late on July 11 as a tropical depression, then maintained its intensity until July 13 when it dissipated inland India.

=== Depression Six ===
- Depression (IMD)
- Tropical depression (SSHWS)
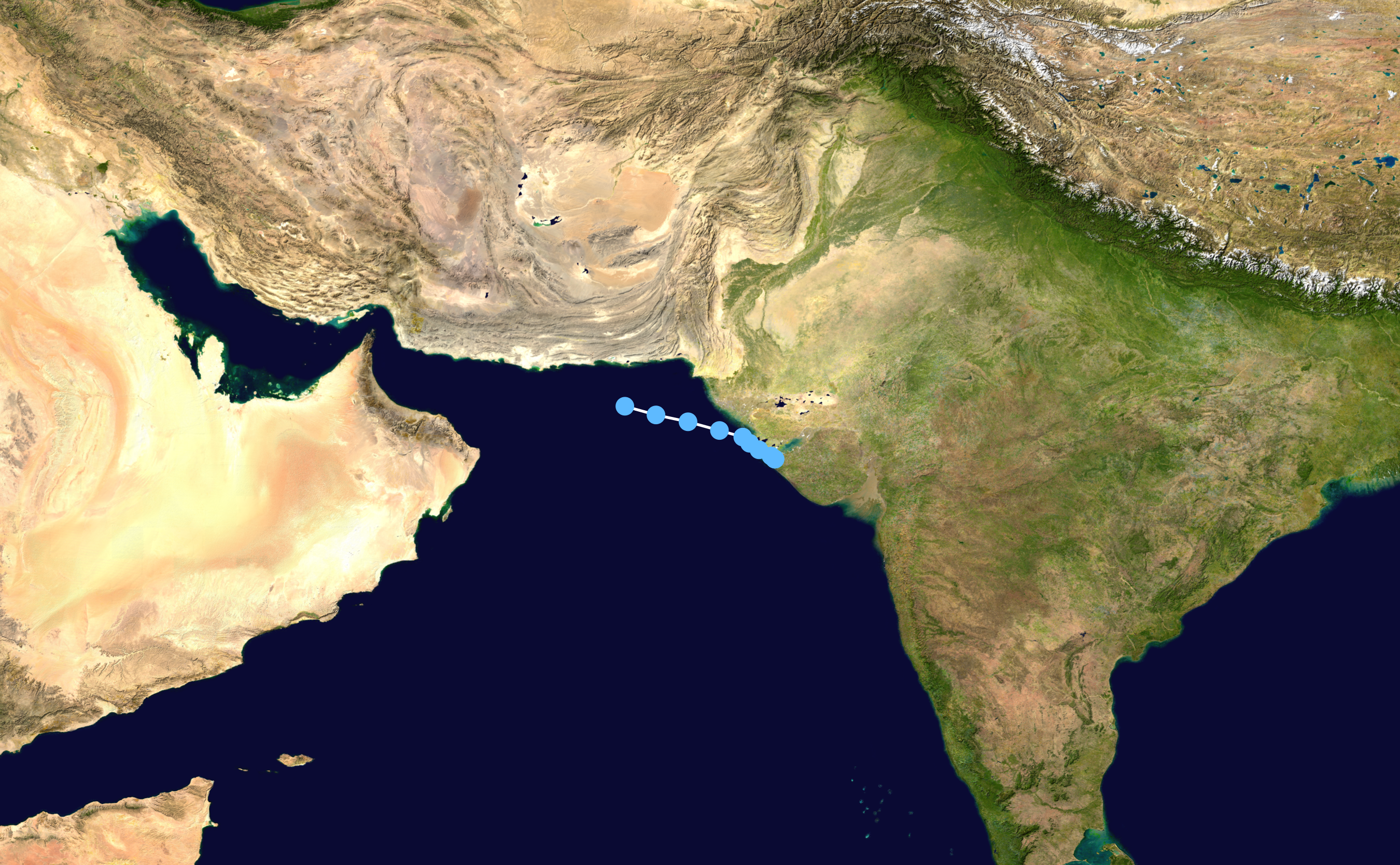
- Duration: July 8 – July 15
- Peak intensity: 45 km/h (30 mph) (1-min);

Depression Six existed from July 8 to July 15. The storm formed and stalled for several days in Gujarat from July 8 to July 13, then moved west into the northern Arabian Sea. The tropical depression later dissipated on July 15, and generally moved west-northwestward in its eight-day lifetime. The storm exited its stall on July 13 and started heading northwestward. The tropical depression exited land and surfaced in the northern Arabian Sea on the same day, and dissipated two days later on July 15 after turning west-northwestward early on July 14.

=== Deep Depression Seven ===
- Deep depression (IMD)
- Tropical depression (SSHWS)
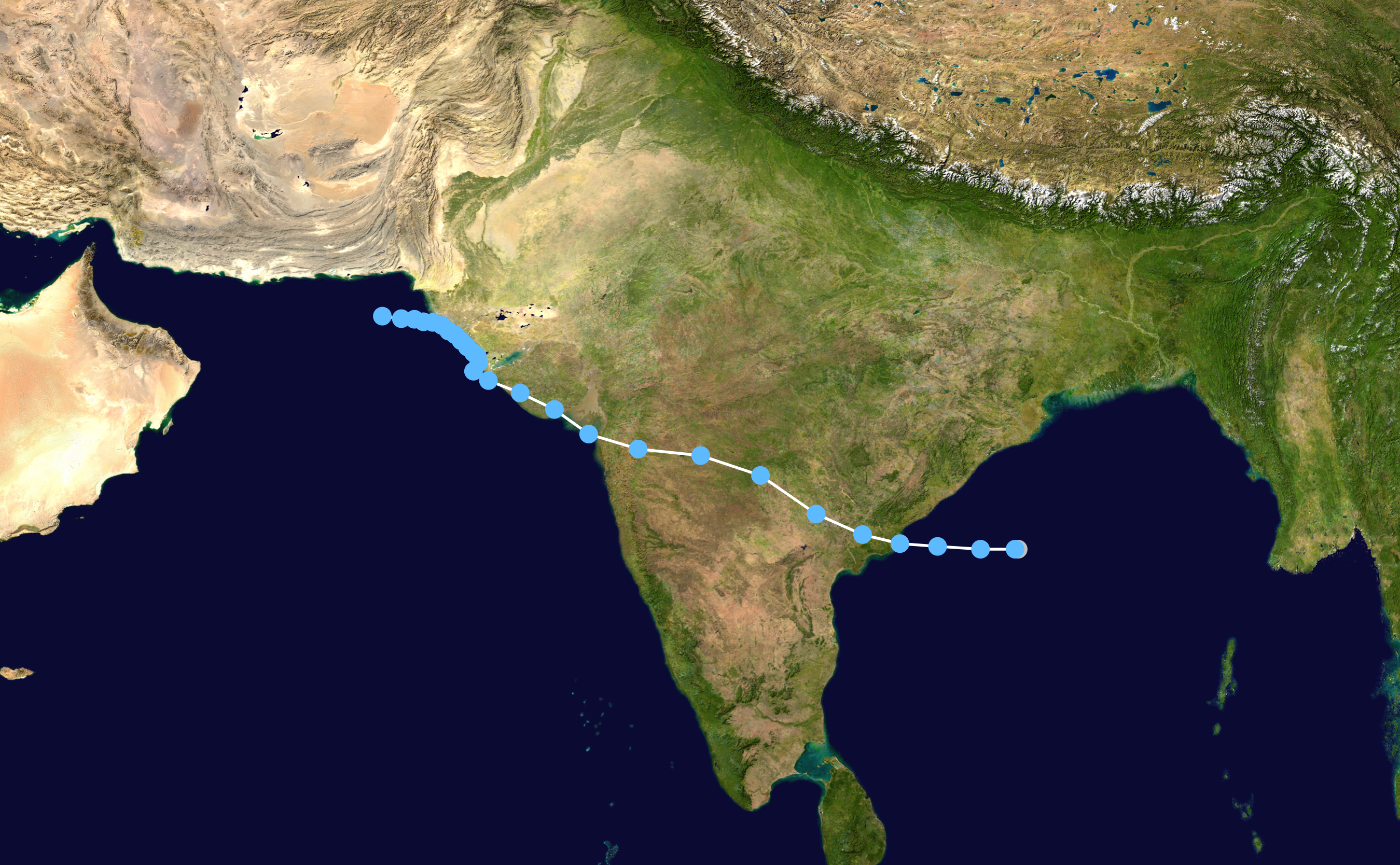
- Duration: September 8 – September 14
- Peak intensity: 35 km/h (25 mph) (3-min);

Deep Depression Seven existed from September 8 to September 15. The storm moved from east to west throughout its lifetime. It formed on September 8 in the western Bay of Bengal and made landfall on eastern India on September 8. The depression crossed India and traced the western coast of the country from September 10 to September 14, making two sharp turns along the way. The storm dissipated in the extreme northern Arabian Sea on September 15.

=== Deep Depression Eight ===
- Deep depression (IMD)
- Tropical depression (SSHWS)
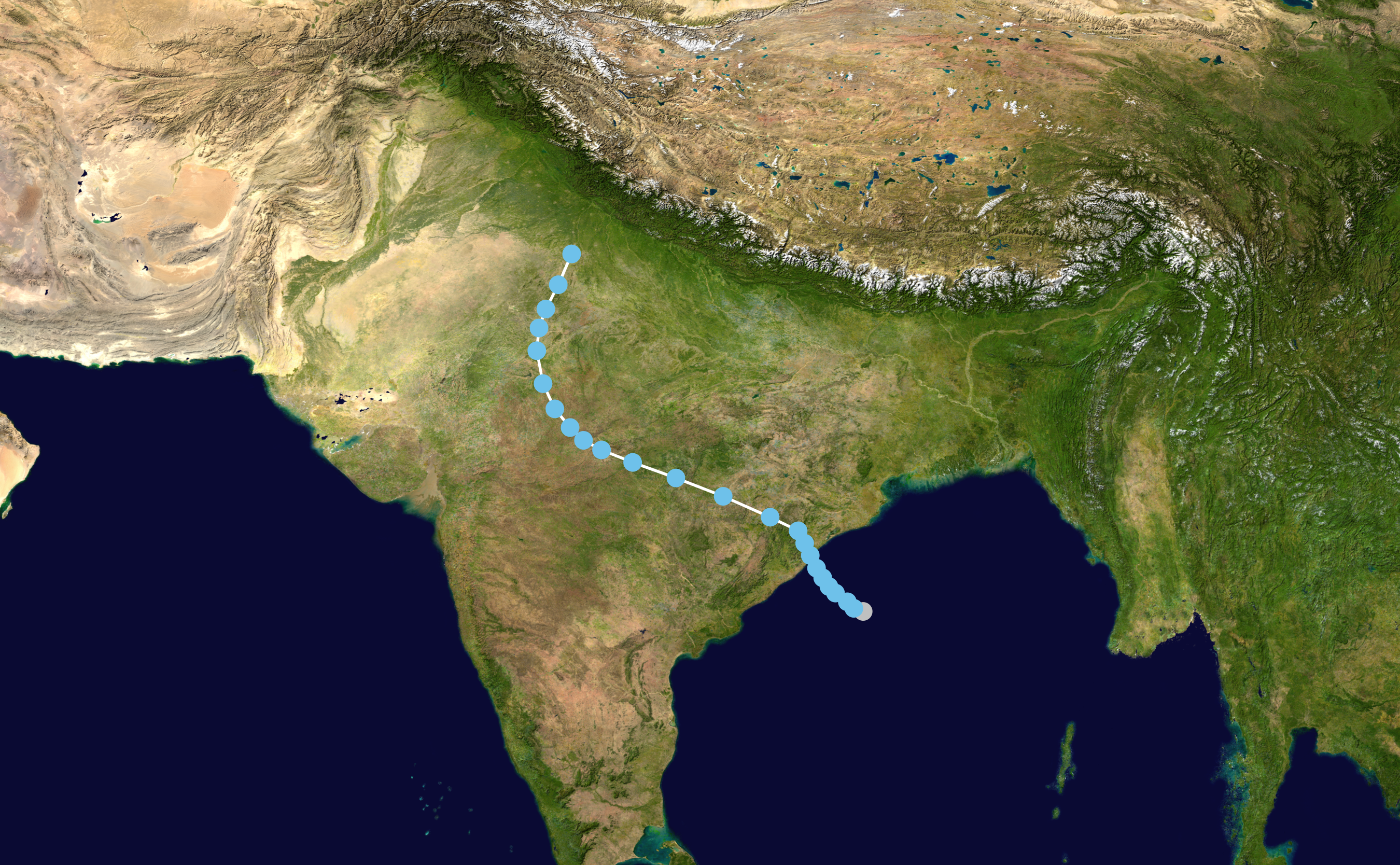
- Duration: September 16 – September 21
- Peak intensity: 85 km/h (50 mph) (3-min);

Deep Depression Eight existed from September 16 to September 21. The storm moved from east to west throughout its 5-day lifetime. It formed on July 16 in the northern Bay of Bengal, moving northwestward until it made landfall on extreme northeastern Andhra Pradesh on July 17. It continued moving northwest until early on July 18 when it turned towards the west-northwestward. It maintained its intensity while turning once again to the northwest on July 19 and then to the north-northeast late on July 20. Finally, it dissipated on July 21 in northern India near New Delhi.

=== Cyclonic Storm Nine ===
- Cyclonic storm (IMD)
- Tropical storm (SSHWS)
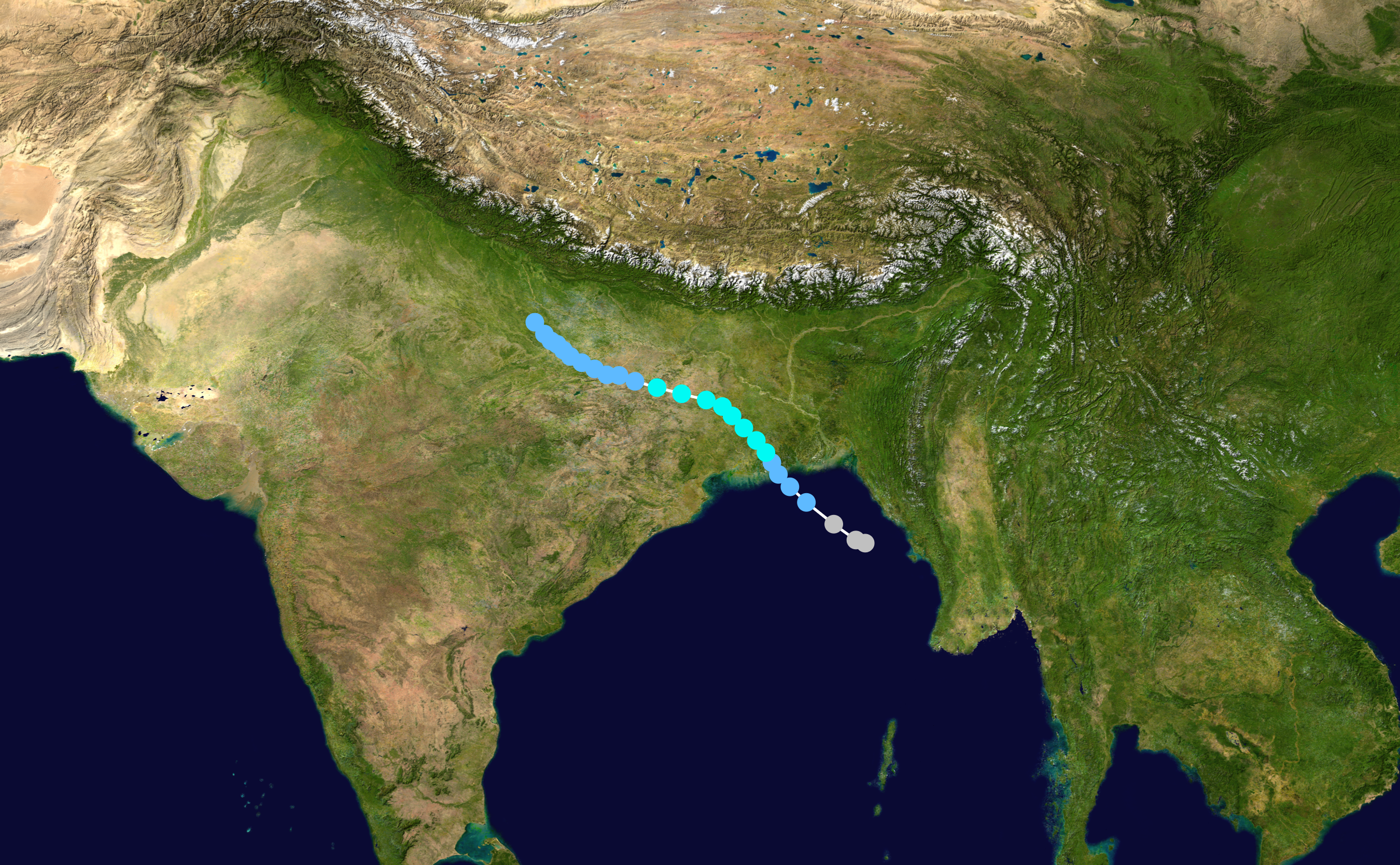
- Duration: September 19 – September 25
- Peak intensity: 90 km/h (55 mph) (3-min); 990 hPa (mbar)

Cyclonic Storm Nine existed from September 19 to September 25. The storm moved from east to west.

=== Deep Depression Ten ===
- Deep depression (IMD)
- Tropical depression (SSHWS)
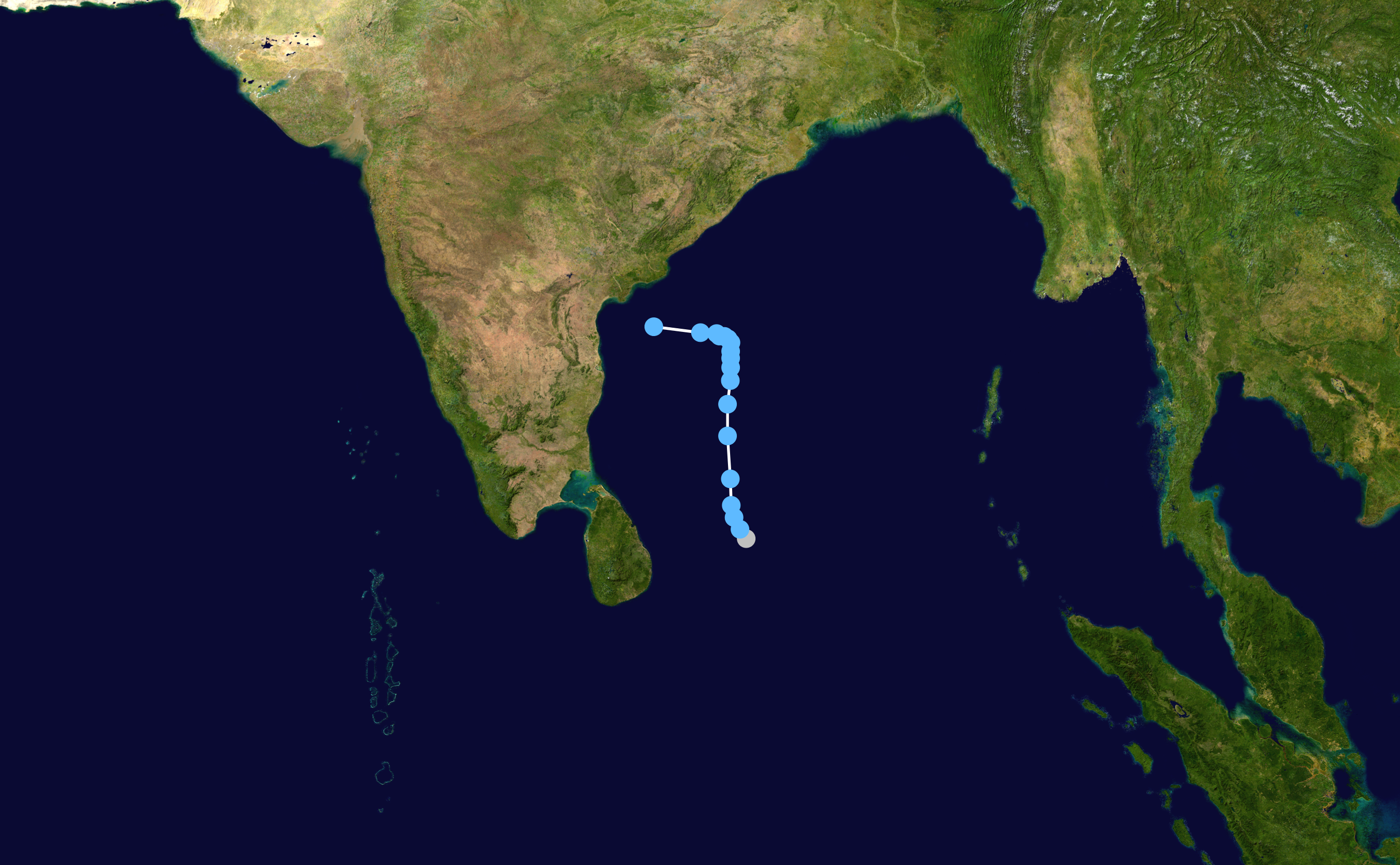
- Duration: October 22 – October 26
- Peak intensity: 75 km/h (45 mph) (3-min); 1000 hPa (mbar)

Deep Depression Ten existed from October 22 to October 26. The storm moved from south to north.

=== Severe Cyclonic Storm Harriet ===
- Severe cyclonic storm (IMD)
- Category 1 tropical cyclone (SSHWS)
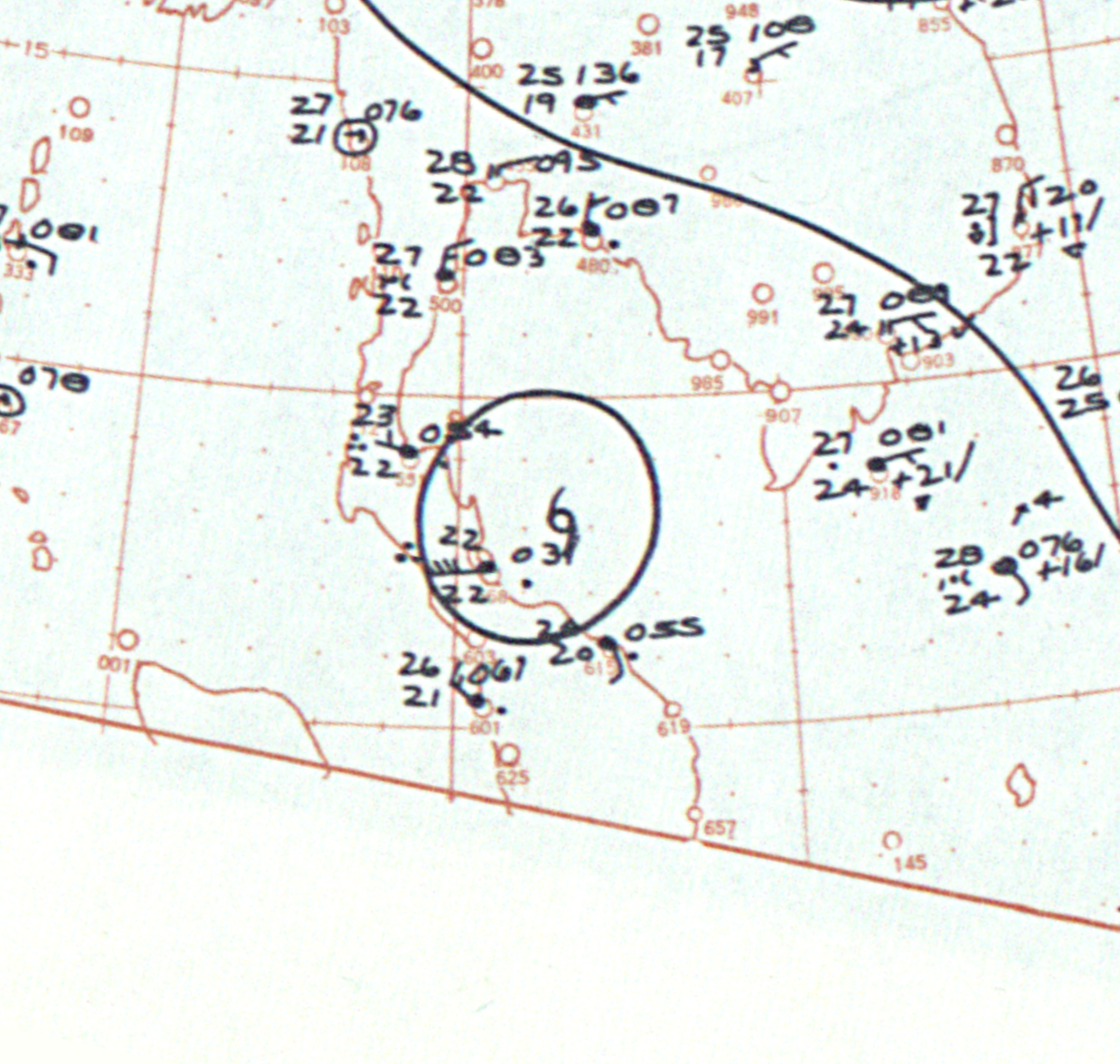
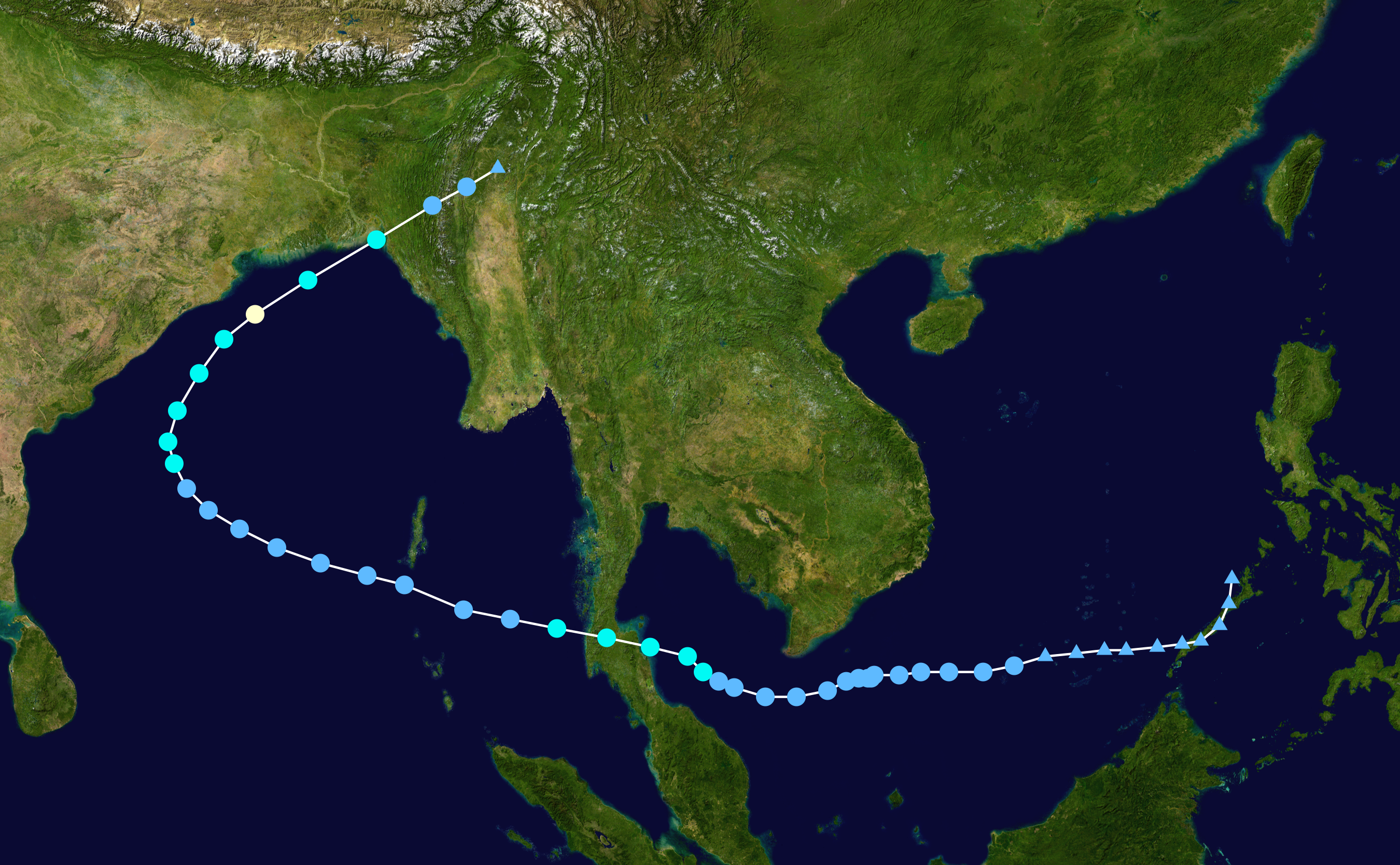
- Duration: October 26 – October 30
- Peak intensity: 100 km/h (65 mph) (3-min); 990 hPa (mbar)

After making landfall in Thailand, the system continued westward, then curved to the northeast, probably regathering strength and making landfall near Chittagong in East Pakistan on October 30 before rapidly dissipating.

The destruction from Tropical Storm Harriet took the lives of at least 769 residents of Thailand's southern provinces. Another 142 people were also deemed missing as of November 4, with over 252 severe injuries. Damage at the time was estimated to be over $34.5 million (1962 USD) to government buildings, agriculture, homes and fishing fleets.

In East Pakistan, the cyclone killed 50,000 people.

=== Very Severe Cyclonic Storm Twelve ===
- Very severe cyclonic storm (IMD)
- Category 1 tropical cyclone (SSHWS)
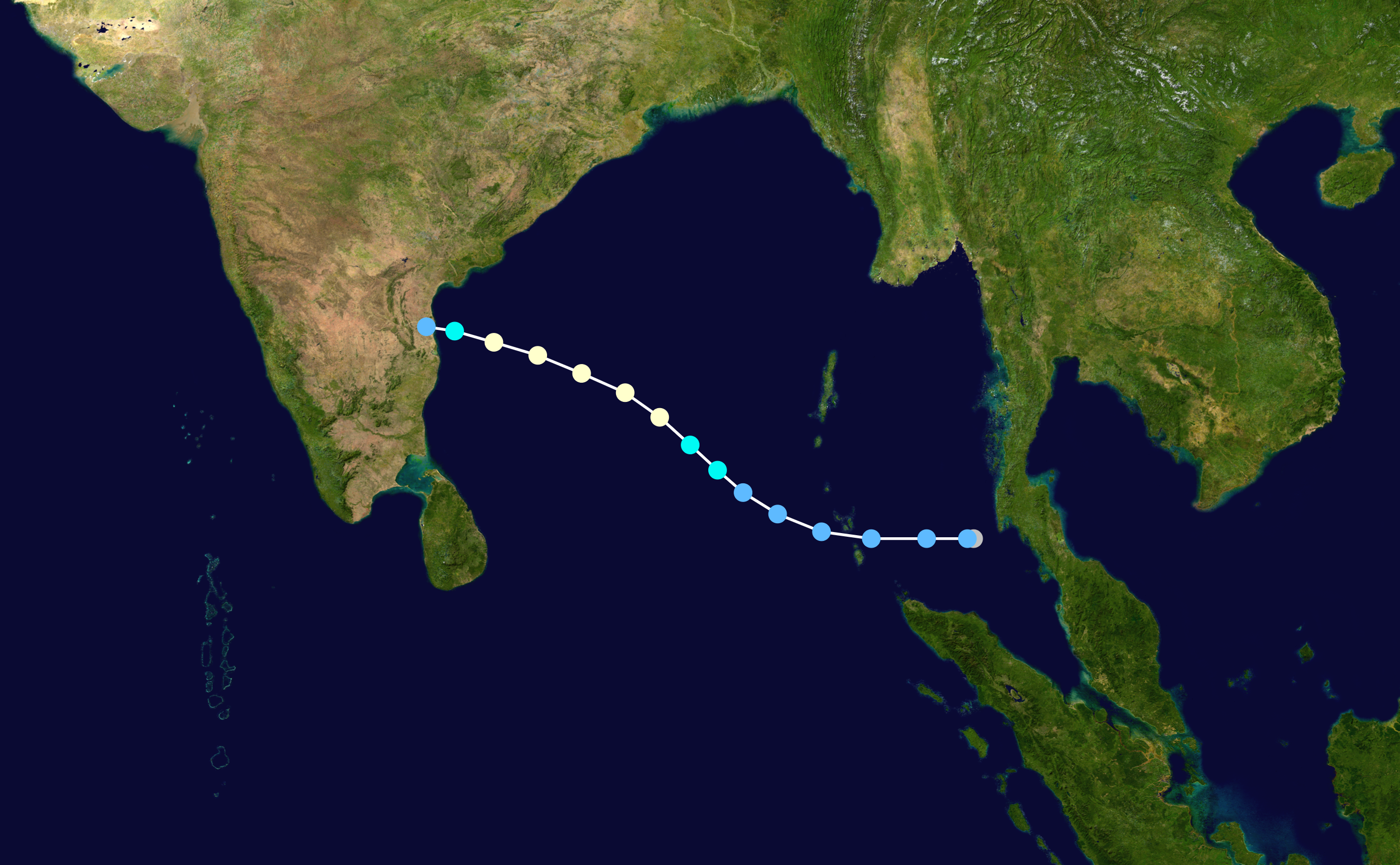
- Duration: November 26 – November 29
- Peak intensity: 140 km/h (85 mph) (3-min); 974 hPa (mbar)

Very Severe Cyclonic Storm Twelve developed on November 26. It was the strongest tropical cyclone of the season, peaking with winds of 140 km/h (85 mph). The system dissipated on November 29. The storm moved from east to west and made a Tropical Storm-equivalent landfall on eastern India.

=== Severe Cyclonic Storm Thirteen ===
- Severe cyclonic storm (IMD)
- Category 1 tropical cyclone (SSHWS)
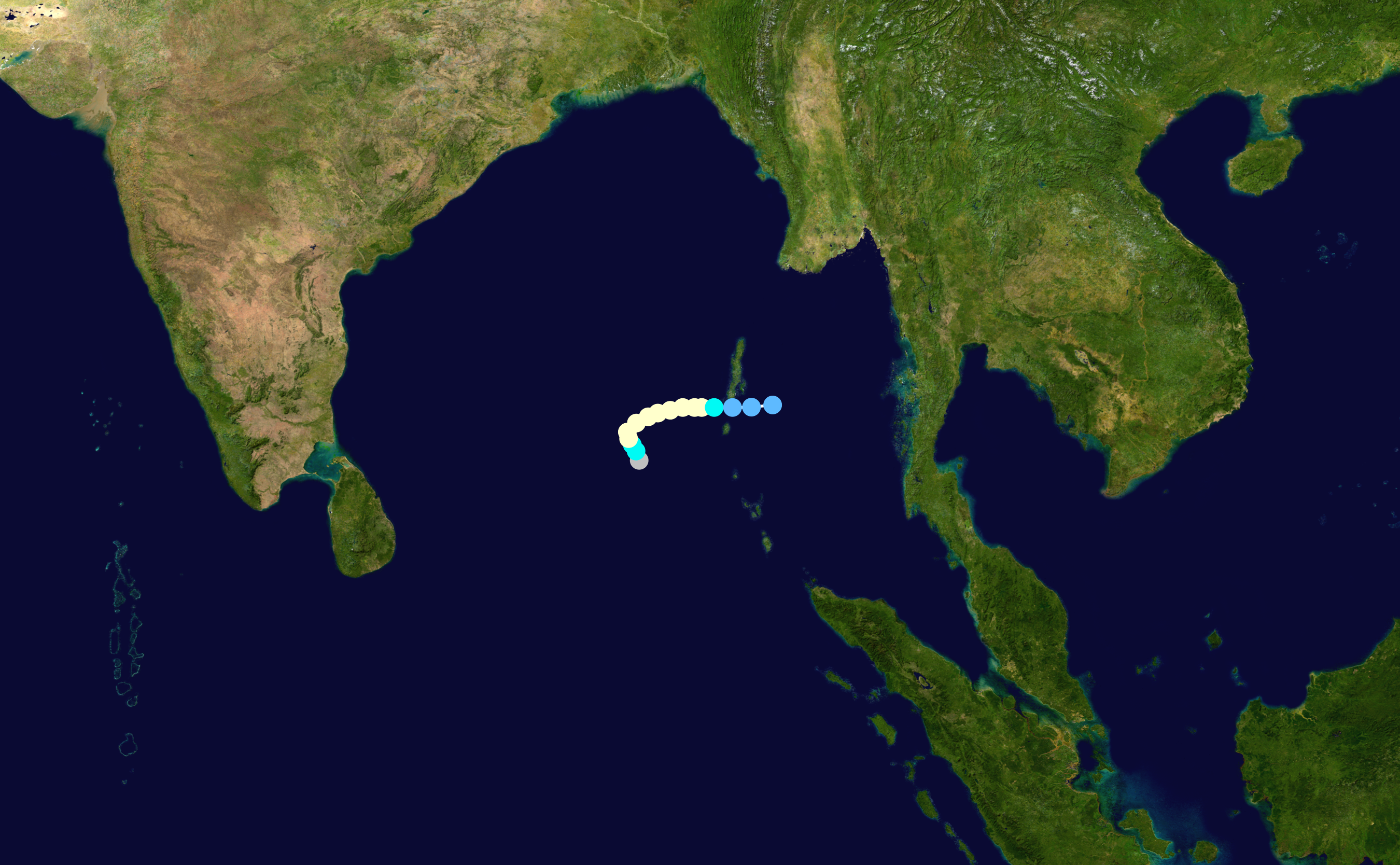
- Duration: December 9 – December 13
- Peak intensity: 95 km/h (60 mph) (3-min); 990 hPa (mbar)

The final storm of the season, Severe Cyclonic Storm Thirteen, developed on December 9. It lasted four days, dissipating on December 13. The storm moved from west to east.

== Season effects ==
This is a table of all storms in the 1962 North Indian Ocean cyclone season. It mentions all of the season's storms and their names, duration, peak intensities (according to the IMD storm scale), damage, and death totals. Damage and death totals include the damage and deaths caused when that storm was a precursor wave or extratropical low, and all of the damage figures are in 1962 USD.

Name	Dates	Peak intensity			Areas affected	Damage (USD)	Deaths	Ref(s).
Name	Dates	Category	Wind speed	Pressure	Areas affected	Damage (USD)	Deaths	Ref(s).
One	May 15–22	Cyclonic storm	75 km/h (45 mph)	994 hPa (29.35 inHg)	India, Sri Lanka	Unknown	Unknown	
Two	May 24–25	Deep Depression	30 km/h (20 mph)	998 hPa (29.47 inHg)	Andaman Islands, East Pakistan, Myanmar	Unknown	Unknown	
Three	May 28–30	Depression	35 km/h (20 mph)	1,004 hPa (29.65 inHg)	Arabian Peninsula	Unknown	Unknown	
Four	June 6–8	Depression	Not specified	1,004 hPa (29.65 inHg)	East Pakistan	Unknown	Unknown	
Five	July 11–13	Deep Depression	55 km/h (35 mph)	982 hPa (29.00 inHg)	India	Unknown	Unknown	
Six	July 8–15	Depression	Not specified	Not specified	India, Pakistan	Unknown	Unknown	
Seven	September 8–14	Deep Depression	35 km/h (20 mph)	Not specified	India, Pakistan	Unknown	Unknown	
Eight	September 16–21	Deep Depression	85 km/h (55 mph)	Not specified	India, Nepal	Unknown	Unknown	
Nine	September 19–25	Cyclonic storm	90 km/h (55 mph)	990 hPa (29.23 inHg)	East Pakistan, India, Nepal	Unknown	Unknown	
Ten	October 22–26	Deep Depression	75 km/h (45 mph)	1,000 hPa (29.53 inHg)	India, Sri Lanka	Unknown	Unknown	
Harriet	October 26–30	Severe Cyclonic Storm	100 km/h (60 mph)	990 hPa (29.23 inHg)	Andaman Islands, East Pakistan, India, Malaysia, Myanmar, Thailand	≥$34.5 million	≥50,769	
Twelve	November 26–29	Very Severe Cyclonic Storm	140 km/h (85 mph)	974 hPa (28.76 inHg)	Andaman Islands, India, Indonesia, Malaysia, Thailand	Unknown	Unknown	
Thirteen	December 9–13	Severe Cyclonic Storm	95 km/h (60 mph)	990 hPa (29.23 inHg)	Andaman Islands	Unknown	Unknown	
Season aggregates
13 systems	May 15 – December 13		140 km/h (85 mph)	974 hPa (28.76 inHg)		≥34.5 million	≥$50769 and missing 142	

== See also ==
- North Indian Ocean tropical cyclone
- List of tropical cyclone records
- 1962 Atlantic hurricane season
- 1962 Pacific hurricane season
- 1962 Pacific typhoon season
- Australian region cyclone seasons: 1961–62 1962–63
- South Pacific cyclone seasons: 1961–62 1962–63
- South-West Indian Ocean cyclone seasons: 1961–62 1962–63
