= Indic languages =

Indic languages may refer to:

- Indo-Aryan languages, a subgroup of the Indo-European languages spoken mainly in the north of the Indian subcontinent
- Languages of the Indian subcontinent, all the indigenous languages of the region regardless of language family, including:
  - Dravidian languages
  - Munda languages

== See also ==
- Indic (disambiguation)
- Northern Indic (disambiguation)
- Indian languages (disambiguation)
- Linguistic history of the Indian subcontinent
- Languages of India
- Indigenous languages of the Americas
