= 1984 Sriharikota cyclone =

North Indian cyclone in 1984

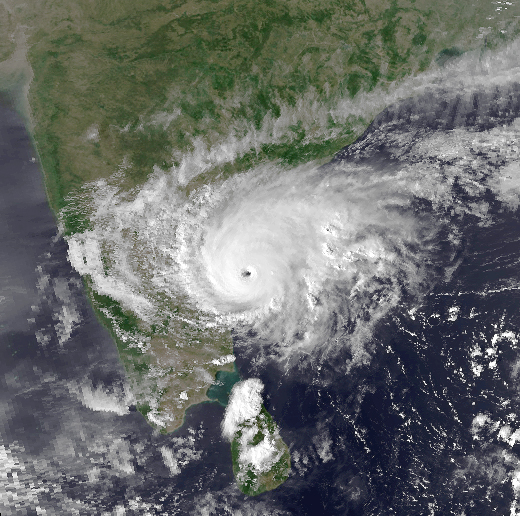
- The cyclone near the east coast of India on 13 November

Meteorological history
- Formed: 9 November 1984
- Dissipated: 15 November 1984

Extremely severe cyclonic storm
- 3-minute sustained (IMD)
- Highest winds: 215 km/h (130 mph)
- Lowest pressure: 975 hPa (mbar); 28.79 inHg

Category 2-equivalent tropical cyclone
- 1-minute sustained (SSHWS/JTWC)
- Highest winds: 155 km/h (100 mph)

Overall effects
- Fatalities: 604
- Areas affected: Andhra Pradesh, Tamil Nadu
- Part of the 1984 North Indian Ocean cyclone season

The 1984 Sriharikota cyclone, officially named Tropical Cyclone 03B by the Joint Typhoon Warning Center, and Extremely Severe Cyclonic Storm BOB 04 by the India Meteorological Department, was the worst to hit the central east coast of India in seven years. Its erratic movement along the coast of Andhra Pradesh brought intense flooding in the Indian states of Andhra Pradesh and Tamil Nadu, resulting in 604 fatalities. The short-lived storm was the most powerful of the 1984 North Indian Ocean cyclone season.

== Background ==
In 1984, the North Indian Ocean saw two uneventful cyclones prior to 9 November. Tropical Cyclone OIA formed in late May, which developed over the western Arabian Sea. This storm tracked west-southwest and into the Gulf of Aden. It struck about 65 km (40 mi) west of Berbera, Somalia, where it quickly dissipated. Cyclone OIA is the first documented and one of a few tropical cyclones to transit the Gulf of Aden since space satellites began tracking in 1966. There were no casualties or damage.

On 12 October, Tropical Cyclone 02B developed in the north-central Bay of Bengal. Due to the presence of Tropical Storm Susan in the South China Sea, it could not develop into a stronger storm. It followed a north–northwest path. The storm made landfall about 19 km (12 mi) south of Balasore, where it rapidly weakened and eventually dissipated. Heavy rains were reported but the storm did not cause damage.

== Meteorological history ==
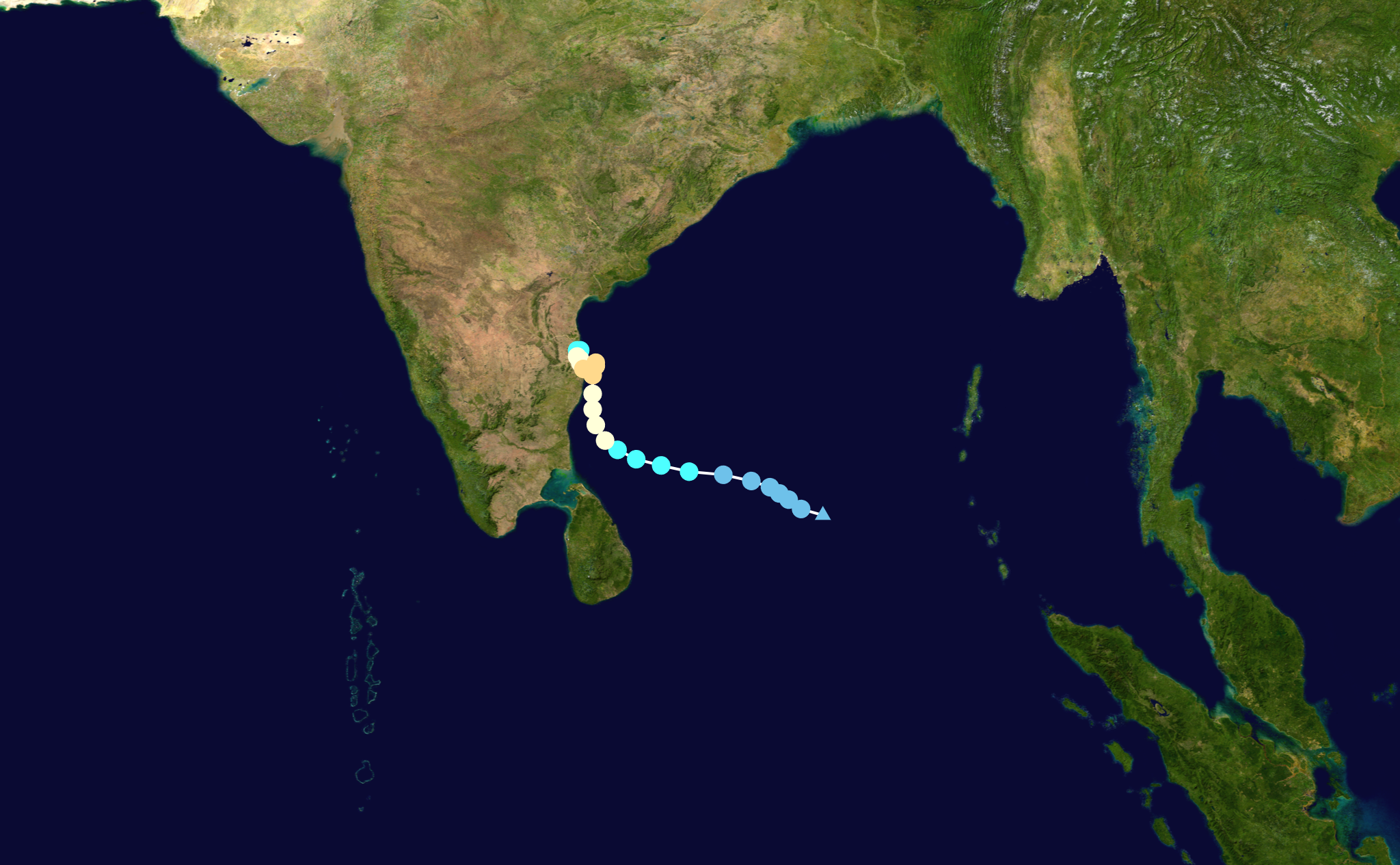
Map plotting the storm's track and intensity, according to the Saffir–Simpson scale Map key Saffir–Simpson scale Tropical depression (≤38 mph, ≤62 km/h) Tropical storm (39–73 mph, 63–118 km/h) Category 1 (74–95 mph, 119–153 km/h) Category 2 (96–110 mph, 154–177 km/h) Category 3 (111–129 mph, 178–208 km/h) Category 4 (130–156 mph, 209–251 km/h) Category 5 (≥157 mph, ≥252 km/h) Unknown Storm type Tropical cyclone Subtropical cyclone Extratropical cyclone, remnant low, tropical disturbance, or monsoon depression

Tropical Cyclone 03B developed as a low-pressure area over the south-central Bay of Bengal on the morning of 9 November. The storm intensified into a deep depression in the evening. It followed a west-northwestward path, becoming a tropical storm on 10 November and a cyclone on the 11th. By the evening, it had become a severe cyclonic storm. A break in the ridge brought it northward, where steering currents collapsed on 13th. The storm traveled north on the 12th, where a 11–28 km (6.8–17.4 mi)-wide eye was observed via satellite. The storm maintained a mostly stationary position during the 13th. After attaining peak winds of 100 mph (160 km/h), the cyclone looped slowly to the west and crossed Sriharikota in southern Andhra Pradesh on the 14th. It gradually dissipated on the 15th.

== Impact ==
The cyclone's intensification, stall and erratic movements occurred very close to the coast, which resulted in prolonged torrential rain and flooding. A total of 604 people died. Flooding affected a large area of Andhra Pradesh and Tamil Nadu. A storm surge of 20 ft (6.1 m) hit the nearby village of Durgarajupatnam which led to coastal inundation up to 3 km (1.9 mi) from the coast. Nearly 1,00,000 livestock were killed and 400,000 houses were destroyed in Andhra Pradesh. A 1.4 m (4 ft 7 in) surge was recorded near Gudur. In nearby Tamil Nadu, the storm brought moderate damage and killed 54 people.

In Andhra Pradesh, over 200 villages were submerged by floodwaters. Thousands of trees were uprooted. Roads and bridges were damaged while rail and electrical services were disrupted. More than 70 villages around Pulicat Lake area were submerged under 10 ft (3.0 m) of water. The rough surges drowned several hundred cattle and 37 residents. There were unconfirmed reports that a village at the shore was buried along with its residents by large amounts of sand.

Seventeen people died in Chennai, and 60,000 individuals who lived in huts became homeless. The cyclone was described as the worst since 1977 in the Nellore district. There, 816 villages across a 7,710 km^{2} (2,980 sq mi) area were struck by heavy winds up to 220 mph (350 km/h). More than 270 people died before rescuers from the Indian army arrived. Another 150,000 were made homeless. About 100 km (62 mi) north of Chennai, towers and electrical poles at the Satish Dhawan Space Centre on Sriharikota island were ripped out. Villages and their residents in northern Tamil Nadu and the south Andhra Pradesh coast were left in extreme conditions. A survivor recalled having to cling onto a tree for two days to escape the water.

== Response ==
Six satellites were operating during the duration of the storm which provided warning to the area. This was in response to the 1977 cyclone, hence the death toll was lower this time. Many AIADMK ministers from Tamil Nadu had moved to New Delhi to attend to electoral matters with the Congress when the cyclone struck. Officials, food and other emergency supplies were rushed to four districts, including Nellore prior to the cyclone's arrival. Rescue operstions took place as soon as the storm subsided. After the disaster, Prime Minister Rajiv Gandhi ordered an assessment team to evaluate the damage in the affected states. N. T. Rama Rao and Prime Minister Gandhi participated in an aerial survey of the area. Prime Minister Gandhi later allocated ₹100 million for relief efforts.
