= Inđić =

Inđić, also transcribed as Indjić, is a Serbian surname. Notable people with the surname include:

- Aleksandar Inđić (born 1995), Serbian chess grandmaster
- Đorđe Inđić (born 1975), Bosnian football manager and former footballer
- Eugen Indjic (1947–2024), Serbian-born American pianist
- Trivo Inđić (1938–2020), Serbian sociologist
