= 1890s North Indian Ocean cyclone seasons =

This article encompasses the 1890s North Indian Ocean cyclone seasons.

== 1890 season ==
=== June 1890 Muscat cyclone ===
This system formed off the west coast of India during the first week of June and moved northwest towards the Arabian Peninsula. Approaching the Gulf of Oman, strong winds and heavy rains affected Sur during the afternoon on June 4. Rain spread west that evening towards Muscat, where winds increased to hurricane-force from the north-northeast early on June 5. The eye of the storm made landfall at Sohar at dusk on June 5, eventually dissipating well inland. Heavy rains fell at the hospital in Muscat, where 11.24 inches (285 mm) were recorded. This led to flooding which took several hundred lives. Several thousand date trees were uprooted by the storm's winds and carried away by its floods. Several homes were leveled in Muscat and Mutrah. Fifty perished from downing near the coast or being buried by debris. Overall, 727 people lost their lives.

== 1891 season ==
- May 19–27, 1891 – A shallow depression developed over the Bay of Bengal to the northeast of Sri Lanka. Over the next few days, the system moved northwards and brought the south-west monsoon over Burma and the Bay of Bengal, before it dissipated off the coast of Ganjam during May 27.
- July 24–30, 1891 – During July 24, a moderate cyclonic storm formed over the Bay of Bengal, near the mouth of the Hooghly River. Over the next few days, the system moved north-westwards
- June 1891- A cyclone struck Mumbai, the first on record to strike the city in the month of June

== 1895 season ==
=== 1895 Odisha cyclone ===
An intense cyclone struck Odisha.

=== 1895 Balochistan cyclone ===
In 1895, a cyclonic storm hit the Makran coast in Balochistan province in modern-day Pakistan.

== 1897 season ==
- May 13, 1897- A storm with 50 mph (80 km/h) winds made landfall in the British Raj province of Burma.
- July 10-12- A tropical depression briefly developed into a tropical cyclone and made landfall in the Gujarat province of modern-day India. The storm then moved inland and dissipated.
- October 21-24 1897- A severe cyclonic storm moved away from modern-day Myanmar, peaked with winds of 75 mph (121 km/h), and dissipated as it neared modern-day Bangladesh. The storm system caused some damage to the coastlines of what are now Myanmar and Bangladesh.
