= Tropical cyclones in India =

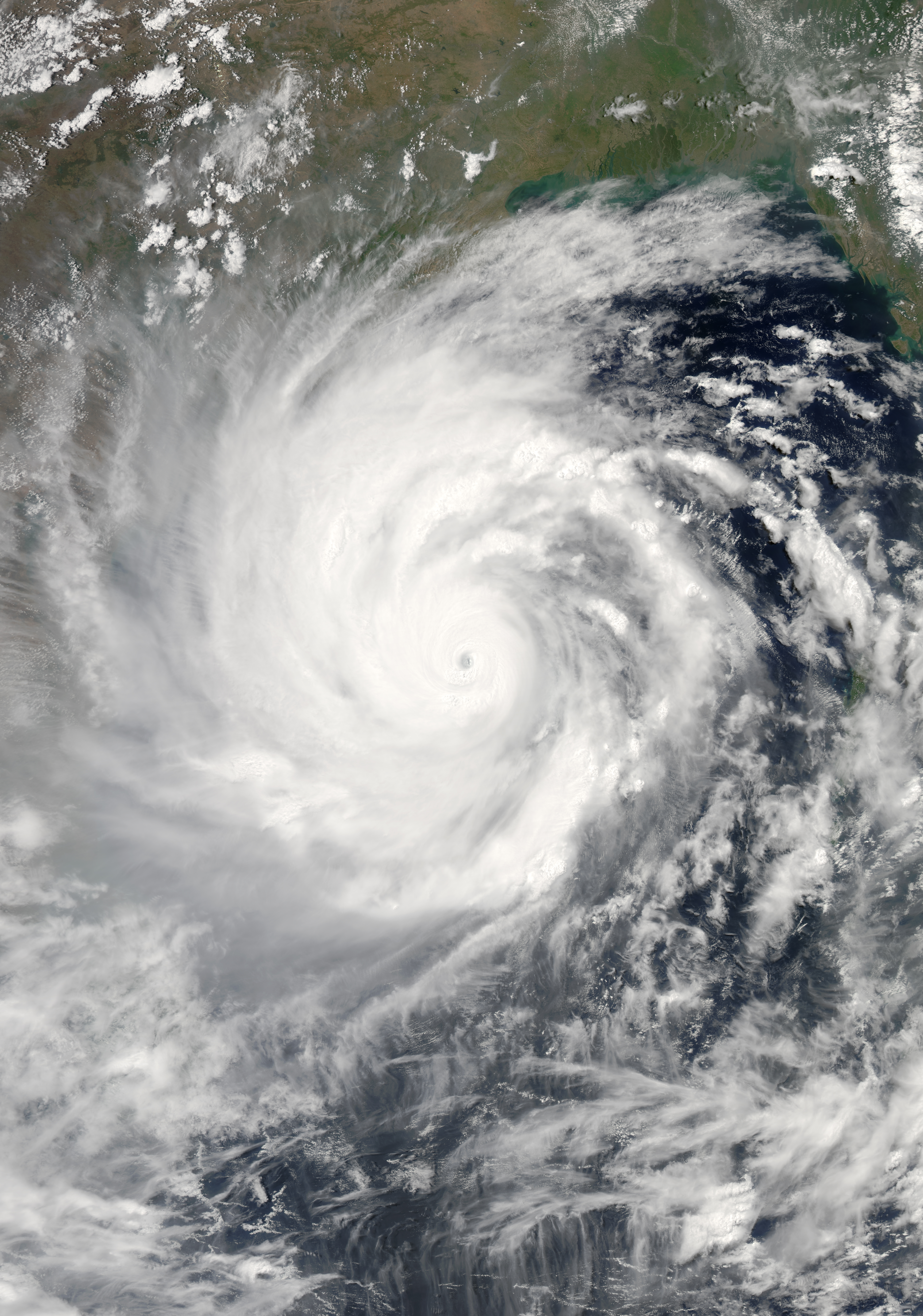
Cyclone Amphan, the second costliest cyclone ever recorded in the North Indian Ocean, at peak intensity over the Bay of Bengal.

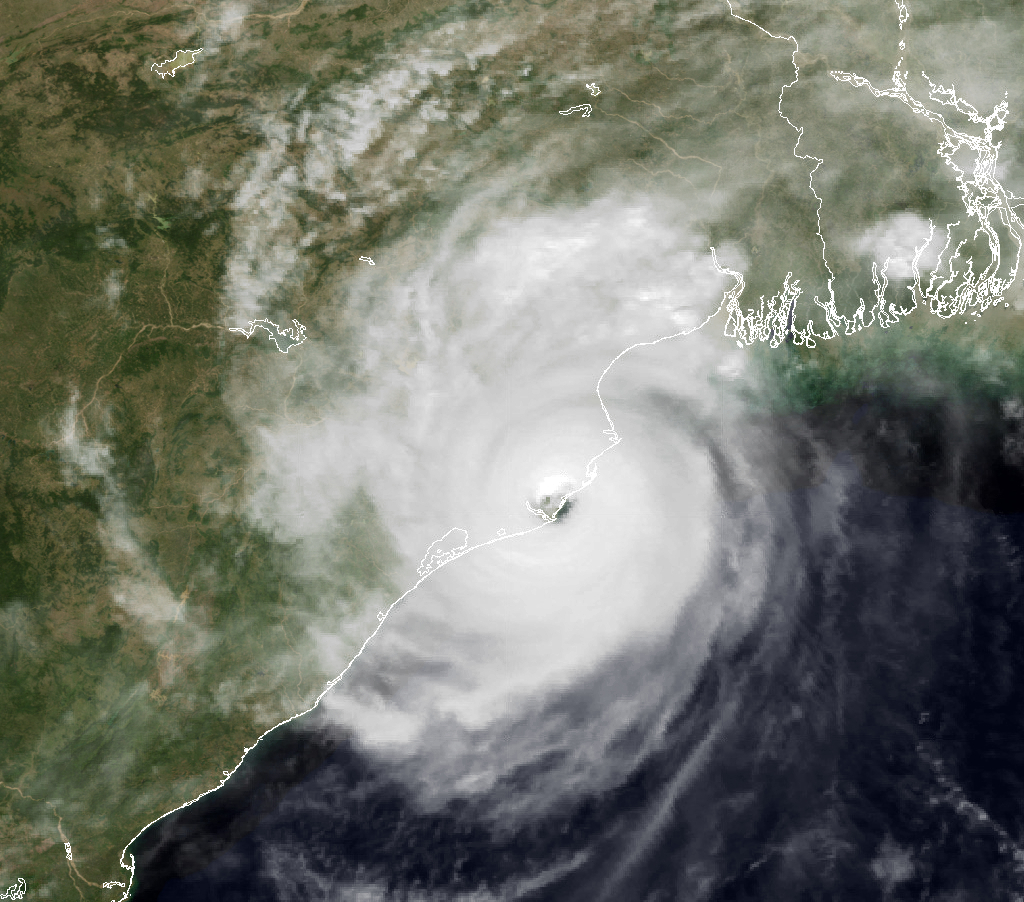
1999 Odisha cyclone on 29 October at its record peak intensity, as it made landfall on Odisha

India is a country in the north of Indian Ocean that is the most vulnerable to getting hit by tropical cyclones in the basin, from the east or from the west. On average, 2–3 tropical cyclones make landfall in India each year, with about one being a severe tropical cyclone or greater.

== Background ==
India is a country in Asia that is bounded by the Arabian Sea, the Indian Ocean and the Bay of Bengal, while it shares land borders with Bangladesh, Bhutan, China, Myanmar, Nepal and Pakistan. India is also located within the vicinity of Sri Lanka and the Maldives, while its Andaman and Nicobar Islands share a maritime border with Thailand, Myanmar and Indonesia. On average around 2 to 4 tropical cyclones impact India every year, while most of these tropical cyclones impact the east coast of Indian states of West Bengal, Odisha, Andhra Pradesh, Tamil Nadu.

From the 1960s to the mid-2000s, 65% of global tropical cyclone fatalities were located in the Bay of Bengal.

The west coast of India is less prone to cyclones; one cyclone out of every two to four hits the west coast and that is loved, with the majority of them occurring in Gujarat, Maharashtra, Goa, Karnataka and Kerala.

== Four stage warning ==
The IMD issues warnings in four stages for the Indian coast.

Stages	Warning	Meaning
Stage 1	Cyclone Watch	Issued 72 hours in advance, it discusses the likelihood of development of a cyclonic disturbance in the north Indian Ocean and the coastal region likely to experience adverse weather.
Stage 2	Cyclone Alert	Issued 48 hours in advance of the commencement of adverse weather over the coastal areas.
Stage 3	Cyclone Warning	Issued 24 hours in advance of the commencement of adverse weather over the coastal areas. The location of landfall is discussed at this stage.
Stage 4	Landfall Outlook	Issued 12 hours in advance of the commencement of adverse weather over the coastal areas. The track of the cyclone after the landfall and the possible impact inland is discussed at this stage.

== List of tropical cyclones by year ==
Note that records before 1960 are largely unreliable and storms that stayed at sea were often only reported by ship reports.

=== 1860s ===
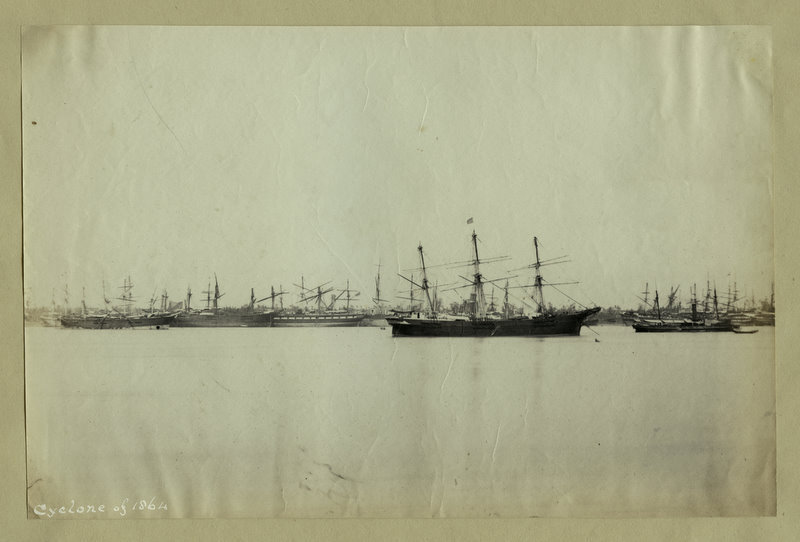
The 1864 Calcutta Cyclone

A powerful cyclone hit Calcutta on 5 October 1864, killing an estimated 60,000 people.

=== November 1867 Great Calcutta cyclone ===
The anemometer in the city was blown away during the cyclone. A lack of storm surge minimized the overall damage from this system.

=== June 1885 Aden cyclone ===
A cyclone had formed near the Laccadive Islands on 24 May, 555 kilometres (345 mi) west of southern India. The SS Mergui encountered the cyclone off the Horn of Africa, 400 kilometres (250 mi) east of Socotra on 1 June and reported it stronger than the tropical cyclone which struck Calcutta in 1864. Just before midnight on the night of 1 June, the Diomed reported winds of hurricane force and a pressure of 984 millibars (29.1 inHg). The ship Peshawar reported a westerly hurricane at the east end of the Gulf of Aden towards midnight on the night of 2 June. At noon on 3 June, the Tantallon reported a pressure of 943 millibars (27.8 inHg) near 12.5N 45.5E. On 3 June, the German corvette Augusta, the French dispatch boat Renard, and the British ship SS Speke Hall were lost in the storm in the Gulf of Aden. The system continued westward and shrank in scale as it moved into the entrance of the Red Sea, crossing the coast of Djibouti. It became the first North Indian Ocean tropical cyclone in recorded history to transit the gulf of Aden with fully hurricane intensity and held the record of westernmost landfalling North Indian Ocean tropical cyclone ever and also the only recorded tropical cyclone to make landfall in the nation of Djibouti.

=== 1885 Odisha cyclone ===
An intense cyclone struck Odisha. It may have killed many lives however there was no evidence of this during those era.

=== 1888 Gujarat Cyclone ===
In November a violent cyclonic storm with hurricane-force winds struck Gujarat causing a ship to sink. Around 1,300 people are killed during the storm.

=== 1891 Siam Cyclone or Port Blair cyclone of 1891 ===
A cyclone had formed in Philippine Sea as depression and made landfall on Philippines. And continue to its path, developed to Tropical Storm before entered Gulf Of Thailand. As it entered, it became typhoon and strengthening into Category-5 Status Tropical Cyclone. It made landfall on Thailand and then toward to Port Blair as Category-5 Tropical Cyclone. Siam Cyclone had weakening into Category-3 Status before made landfall at Northern India.

=== 1900s ===
==== 1902 ====
- In May 1902, a cyclonic storm struck the coast in the vicinity of Karachi.

==== 1907 ====
- In June 1907, a tropical storm struck the coast near Karachi.

=== 1910s ===
==== 1910s ====
- 13–16 April 1910 – A intense tropical existed over Andaman Sea.

=== 1920s ===
==== 1928 ====
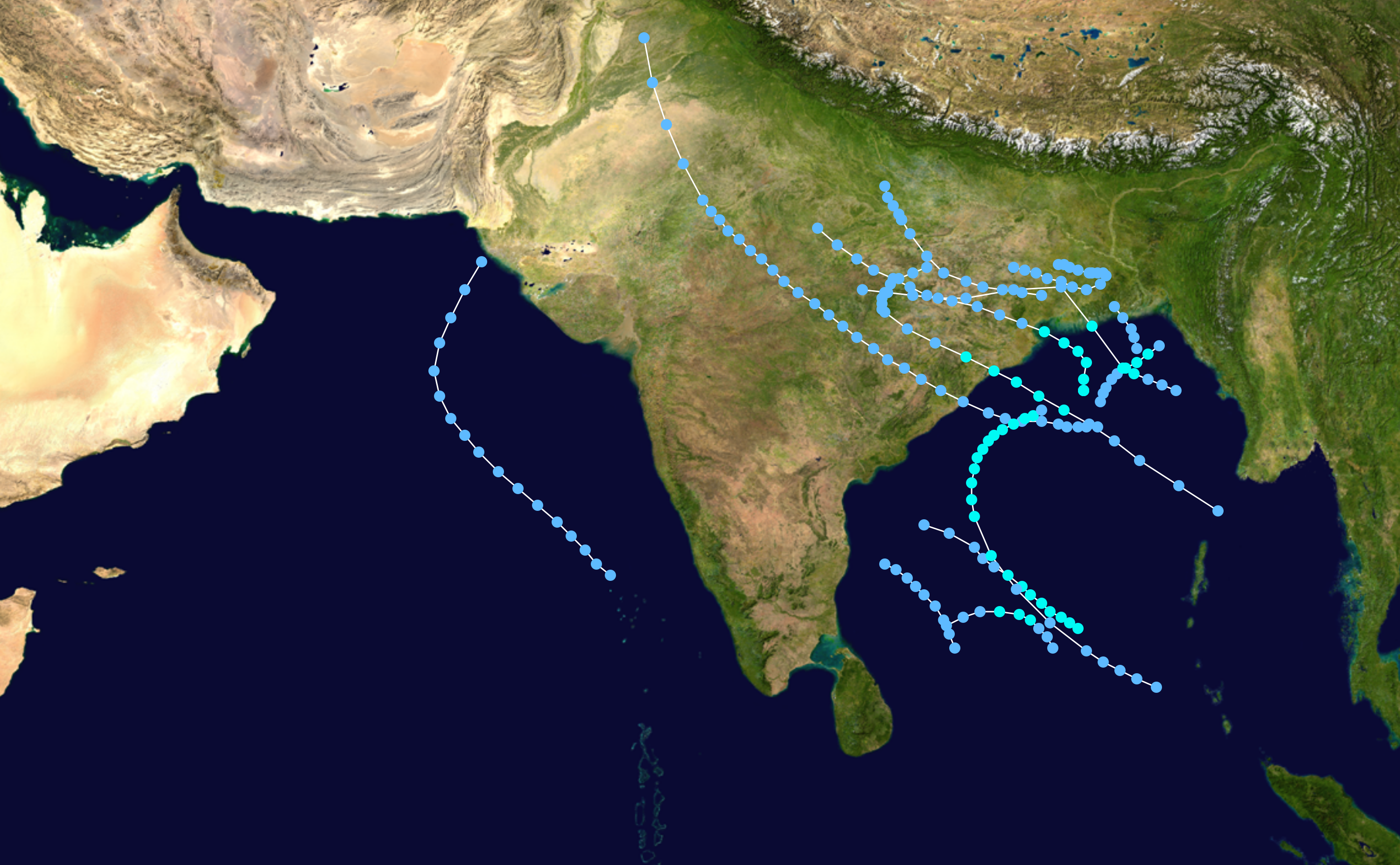
1928 North Indian Ocean cyclone season summary

- 31 December 1927 – 5 January 1928 – A depression existed over the southern Bay of Bengal.
- 29 February – 6 March 1928 – A depression existed over the northeaster Arabian Sea.
- 24–28 March 1928 – A cyclonic storm existed over the southern Bay of Bengal.

==== 1929 ====
There were 15 depressions and 6 cyclonic storms.

=== 1930s ===
- 2–7 May 1930 – A cyclonic storm existed over the southern Bay of Bengal.
- 10–13 May 1930 – A cyclonic storm existed over the northern Bay of Bengal.
- 14–16 June 1930 – A shallow depression existed over the northeastern Bay of Bengal.
- 20–23 June 1930 – A depression existed over the southeastern Arabian Sea.
- 27–30 June 1930 – A cyclonic storm existed over the eastern Arabian Sea.
- 28 June – 1 July 1930 – A cyclonic storm existed over the eastern Bay of Bengal.
- 8–10 July 1930 – A shallow depression existed over the northern Bay of Bengal.
- 11–13 July 1930 – A cyclonic storm existed over the northern Bay of Bengal.
- 21–24 July 1930 – A depression existed over the northern Bay of Bengal.
- 6–8 September 1930 – A depression existed over the Andaman Sea.

=== 1940s ===
- 17–25 May 1940 – A severe cyclonic storm existed over the Bay of Bengal.
- 23–27 June 1940 – A cyclonic storm existed over the Bay of Bengal.
- 29 June – 5 July 1940 – A severe cyclonic storm existed over the Bay of Bengal.
- 6–11 July 1940 – A severe cyclonic storm existed over the Bay of Bengal.
- 1–11 August 1940 – A cyclonic storm existed over the Bay of Bengal.
- 11–16 August 1940 – A depression existed over the Bay of Bengal.
- 18–26 August 1940 – A depression existed over the Bay of Bengal.
- 26 August – 1 September 1940 – A depression existed over the Bay of Bengal.
- 14–24 September 1940 – A depression existed over the Bay of Bengal.
- 17–21 September 1940 – A depression existed over the Bay of Bengal.
- 9–20 October 1940 – A severe cyclonic storm existed over the Arabian Sea.
- 19–22 October 1940 – A severe cyclonic storm existed over the Bay of Bengal.
- 3–13 November 1940 – A severe cyclonic storm existed over the Arabian Sea.
- 11–18 November 1940 – A depression existed over the Bay of Bengal and the Arabian Sea.
- 14–24 November 1940 – A cyclonic storm existed over the Bay of Bengal.
- 19–30 December 1940 – A depression existed over the Bay of Bengal.

=== November 1940 Mumbai Cyclone ===
In November 1940, a severe cyclone struck Mumbai, with gusts reaching reached 121 km/h in Colaba. There were bodies floating in floodwaters, and the cyclone cost the city 25 lakh rupees.

=== 1950s ===
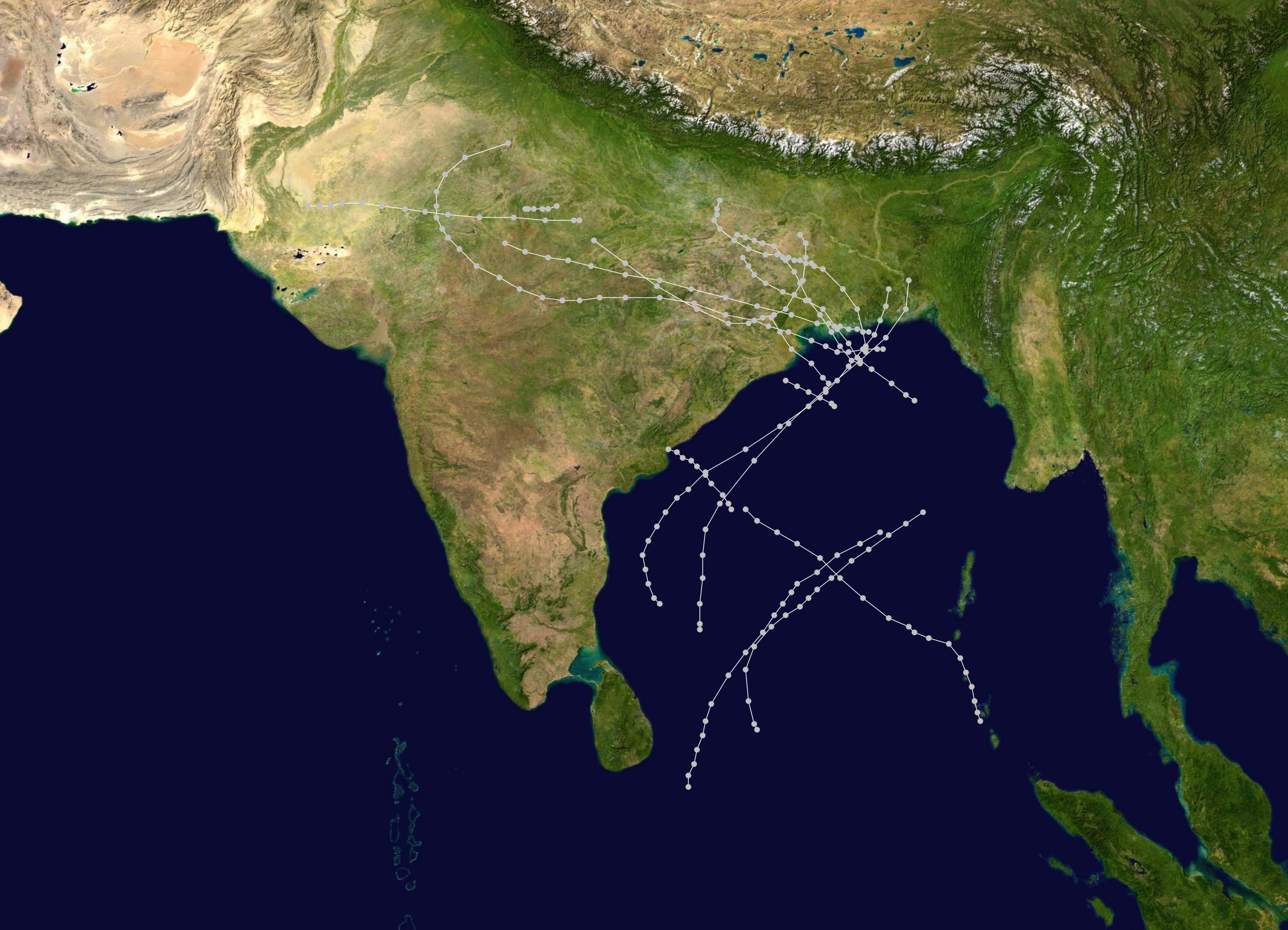
Season summary

- 8–13 April 1950 – A deep depression existed over the Bay of Bengal.
- 23–30 May 1950 – A deep depression existed over the Bay of Bengal.
- 8–12 June 1950 – A cyclonic storm existed over the Bay of Bengal.
- 23–28 June 1950 – A depression existed over the Bay of Bengal.
- 10–12 July 1950 – A depression existed over the Bay of Bengal.
- 11–15 July 1950 – A depression existed over land.
- 25–30 July 1950 – A depression existed over the Bay of Bengal.
- 3–7 August 1950 – A depression existed over land.
- 9–15 August 1950 – A depression existed over the Bay of Bengal.
- 1–5 September 1950 – A depression existed over land.
- 9–11 September 1950 – A depression existed over the Bay of Bengal.
- 12–19 September 1950 – A cyclonic storm existed over the Bay of Bengal.
- 22–24 September 1950 – A depression existed over the Bay of Bengal.
- 17–22 October 1950 – A depression existed over the Bay of Bengal.
- 16–20 November 1950 – A cyclonic storm existed over the Bay of Bengal.
- 2–6 December 1950 – A cyclonic storm existed over the Bay of Bengal.
- In June 1956, a cyclone struck Midnapore and killed 480 people.

=== 1960s ===
==== 1960 ====
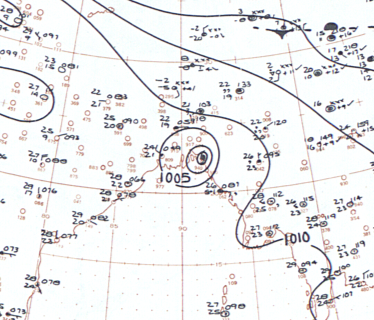
Very Severe Cyclonic Storm Ten

The season was above average with five cyclones forming and one making landfall over India.

==== 1961 ====
The season was above average, with five cyclones forming and three making landfall over India.

- Severe Cyclonic Storm Four struck Southwestern India in May and did considerable damage.

==== 1962 ====
The season included four cyclones, with one entering from the West Pacific Ocean, making a total of five cyclones.

==== 1963 ====
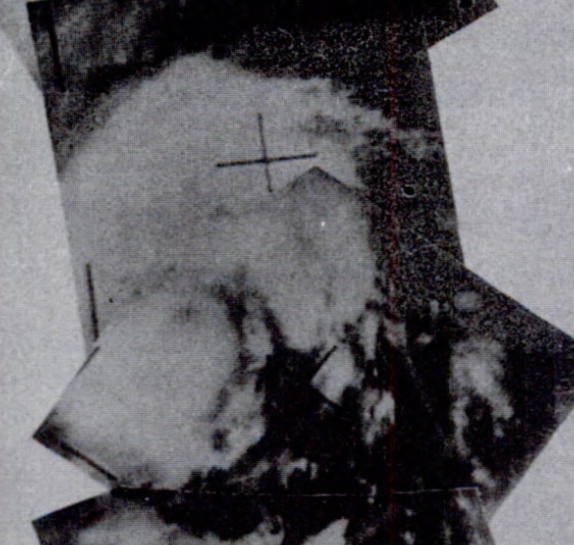
Extremely Severe Cyclonic Storm Two

The season was above average with seventeen depressions forming. Out of them, six cyclones formed with four making landfall in India. The season includes the first Super Cyclonic Storm to be recorded in the satellite era.

- Extremely Severe Cyclonic Storm Two caused heavy rainfall in Laccadive Islands. It was considered one of the strongest Arabian Sea cyclones based on pressure until the 2001 Gujarat cyclone.
- Deep Depression Four produced torrential rains in parts of Eastern India.
- Deep Depression Nine caused 15 deaths form flooding in Orissa.
- Very Severe Cyclonic Storm Twelve caused some damage and flooding in India, with loss of life also being reported.

==== 1964 ====
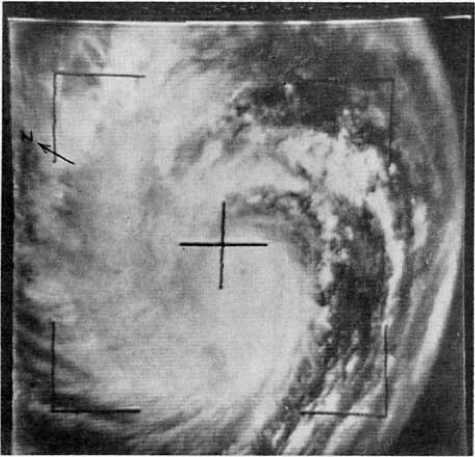
Super Cyclonic Storm Sixteen

The season was above average, with seven cyclones forming, three of which made landfall over India and one threatened the coast.

- Super Cyclonic Storm Sixteen was the most powerful cyclone to strike Tamil Nadu and Ceylon. It also overturned a passenger train and killed 200 people on board. It destroyed the town of Dhanushkodi because of a 25 ft (7.6 m) storm surge and after that, the Government of Madras said that it was 'unfit for human civilization' and declared as a ghost town.

==== 1965 ====
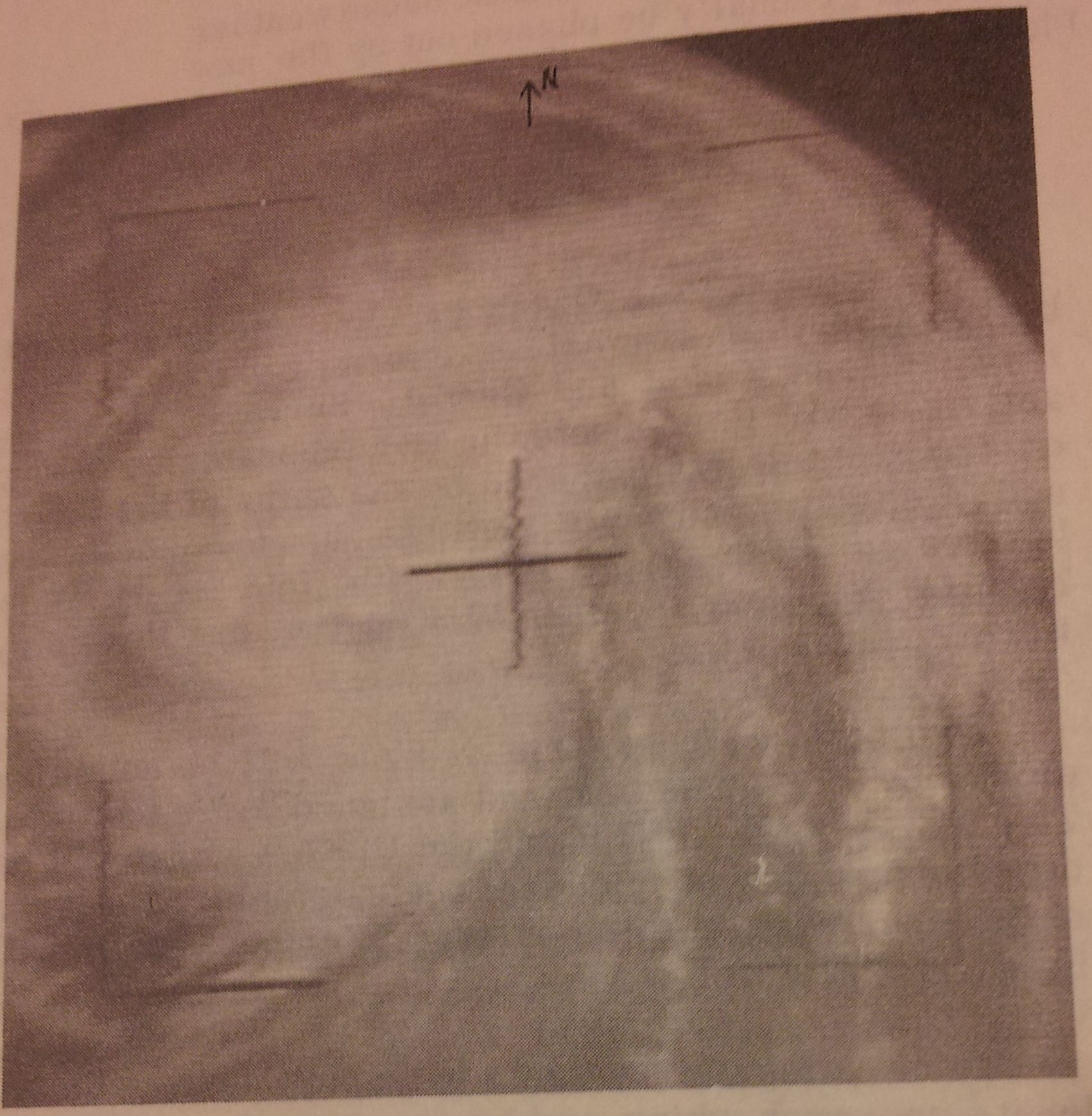
1965 Bangladesh cyclone

This season included three deadly back-to-back cyclones which affected West Bengal and Bangladesh collectively in the months of May, June and November, killing up to 50,000 people.

==== 1966 ====
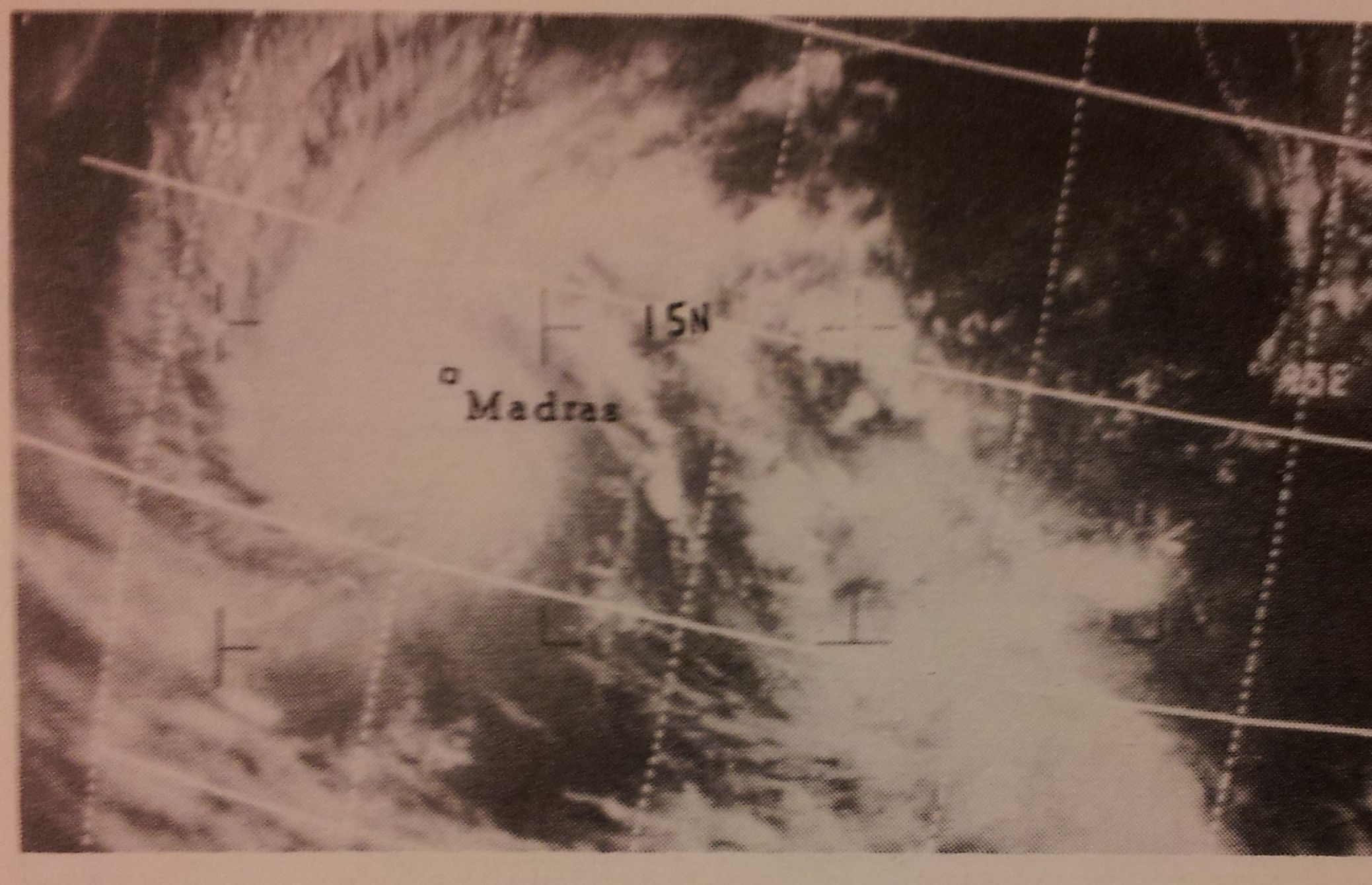
1966 Madras cyclone

The season was above average, with eight cyclones forming and six intensifying further into severe cyclonic storms.

- A cyclone struck Madras (now Chennai) on 3 November, killing over 50 people and leaving 800,000 people homeless.

==== 1967 ====
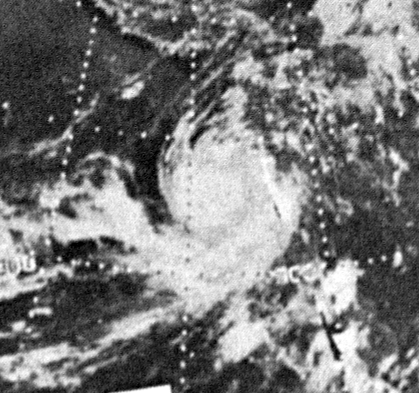
Cyclonic Storm Two

==== 1968 ====
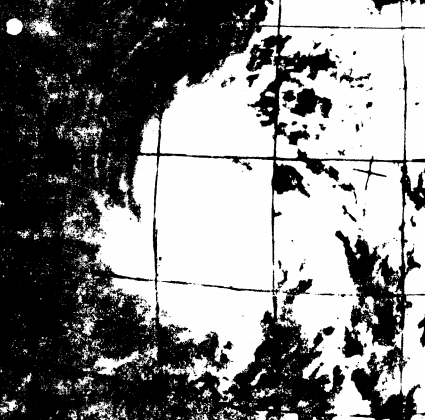
1968 Myanmar cyclone

==== 1969 ====
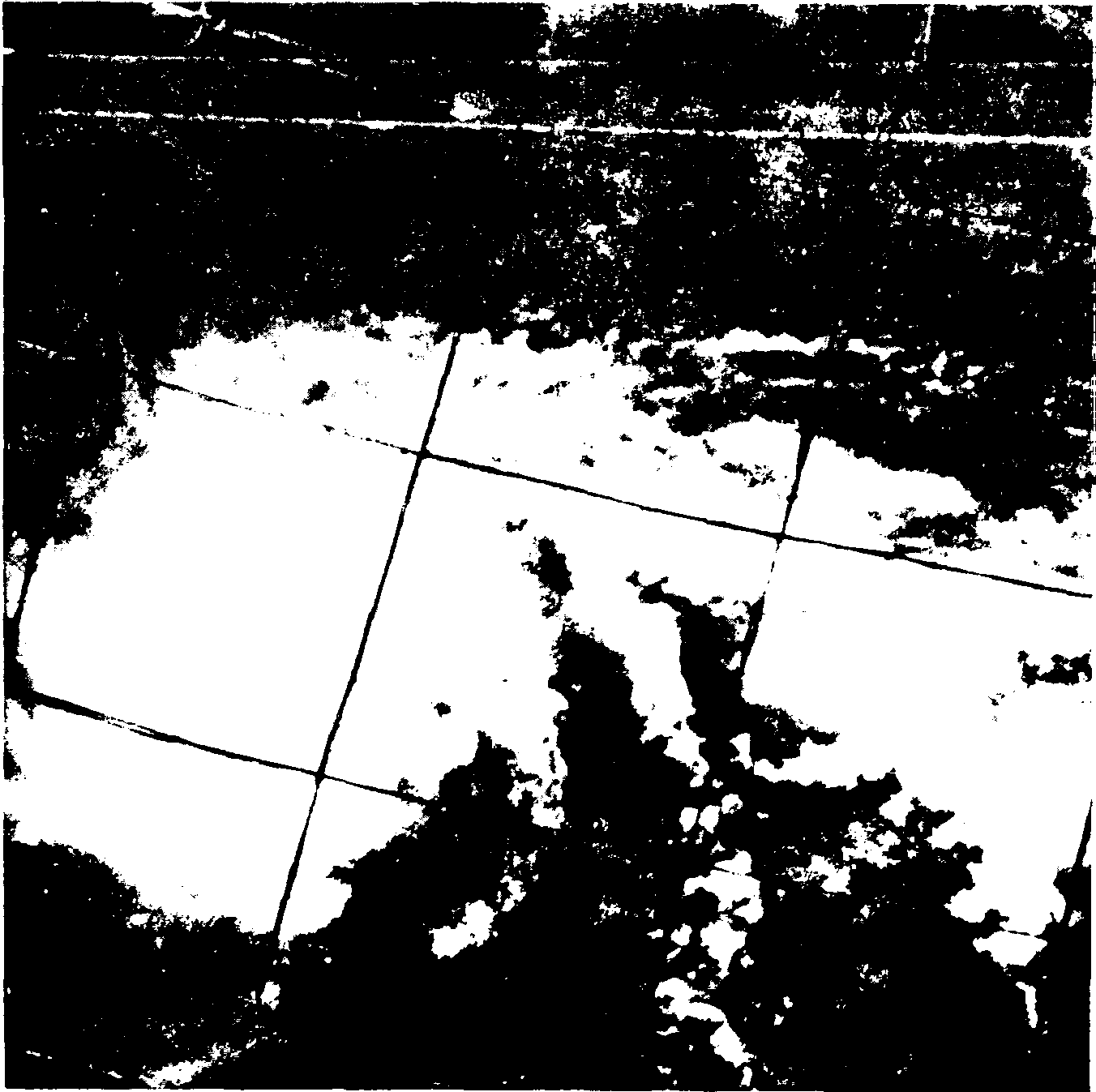
Extremely Severe Cyclonic Storm Ten

This season included two back-to-back cyclones affecting Andhra Pradesh in May and November, killing 900 people collectively.

=== 1970s ===
==== 1970 ====
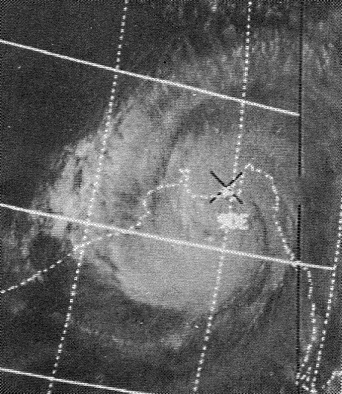
Extremely Severe Cyclonic Storm Thirteen

The season was above average, with seven cyclones forming, two of which made landfall over India.

- Cyclonic Storm Four made landfall over Odisha in the month of June and brought widespread rainfall over East and Central India. Many places received more than 10 cm of rainfall at a single day.
- Cyclonic Storm Eight formed as a land depression in the month of September and skirted the whole nation before entering into the Arabian Sea and intensifying up to the stage of cyclonic storm. Many states which were located in the track received heavy rainfall up to 40 cm.
- Very Severe Cyclonic Storm Twelve on its initial stages brought heavy rainfall over Tamil Nadu and made landfall at West Bengal in the month of November. Kolkata received gust winds as high as 120 kmph and Shillong received heavy rainfall up to 22 cm. Bangladesh suffered worst damage by the storm killing 290 people. The amount of damage in India was unknown.
- Extremely Severe Cyclonic Storm Thirteen was the deadliest tropical cyclone in tropical cyclone history. It made landfall in East Pakistan (now called Bangladesh) but also caused significant effect in West Bengal and heavy rainfall in Andaman and Nicobar Islands. This cyclone made landfall within few days after Cyclone Twelve attacked the same area and brought additional damage there.

==== 1971 ====
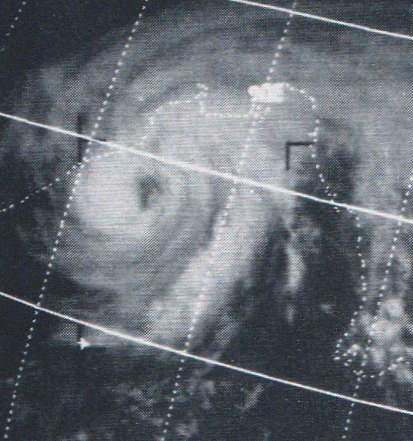
1971 Odisha cyclone

This season was above average, with seven cyclones forming and four making landfall over India.

- Three cyclones hit back-to-back over the states of Odisha and West Bengal which brought considerable damage to livelihood and agricultural crops. 160 people were reported to be killed by the three storms.
- 1971 Odisha cyclone hit the city of Paradip in the month of October and became deadly storm by killing 11,000 people. Whole state of Odisha has suffered damage due to gust winds up to 185 kmph.

==== 1972 ====
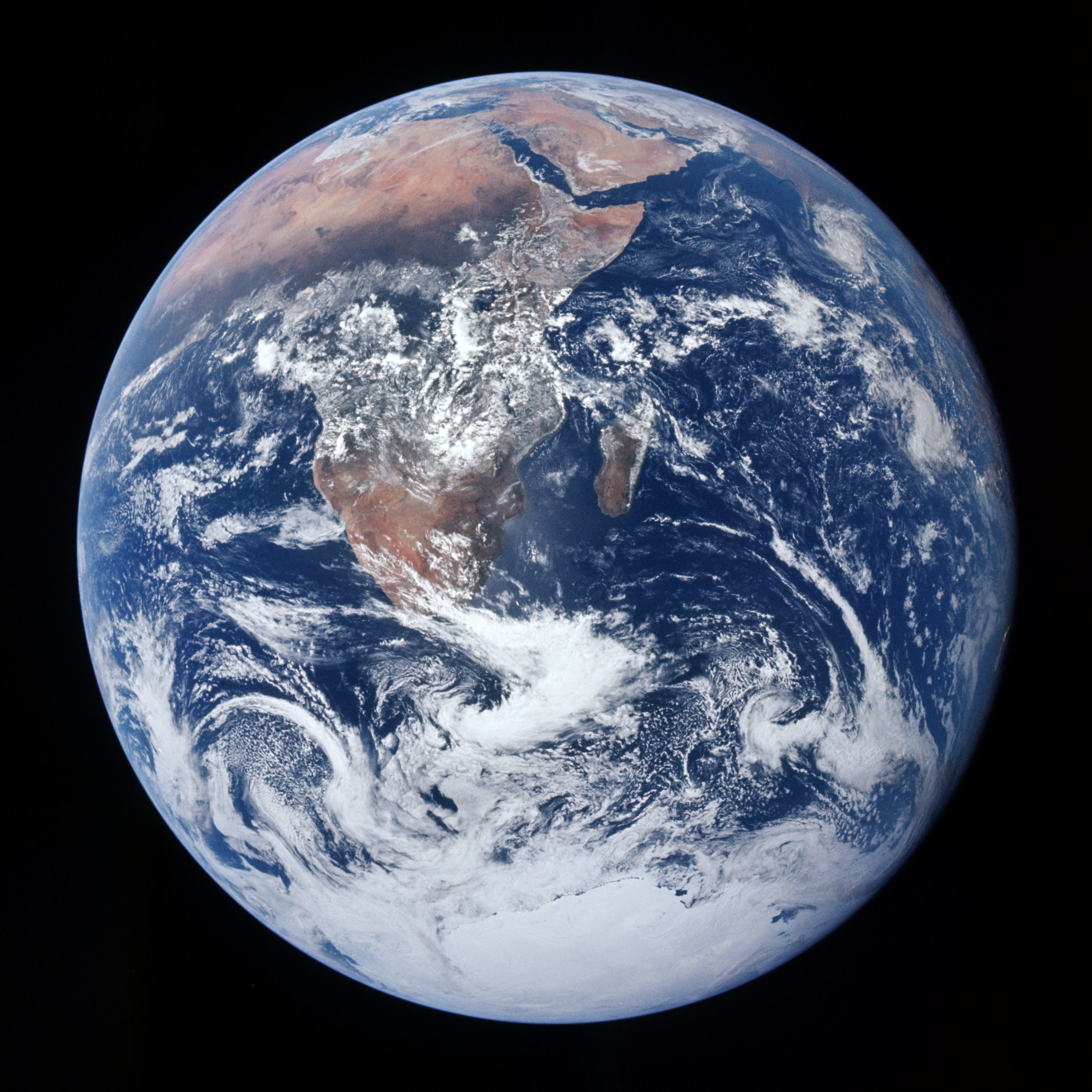
1972 Tamil Nadu cyclone

==== 1973 ====
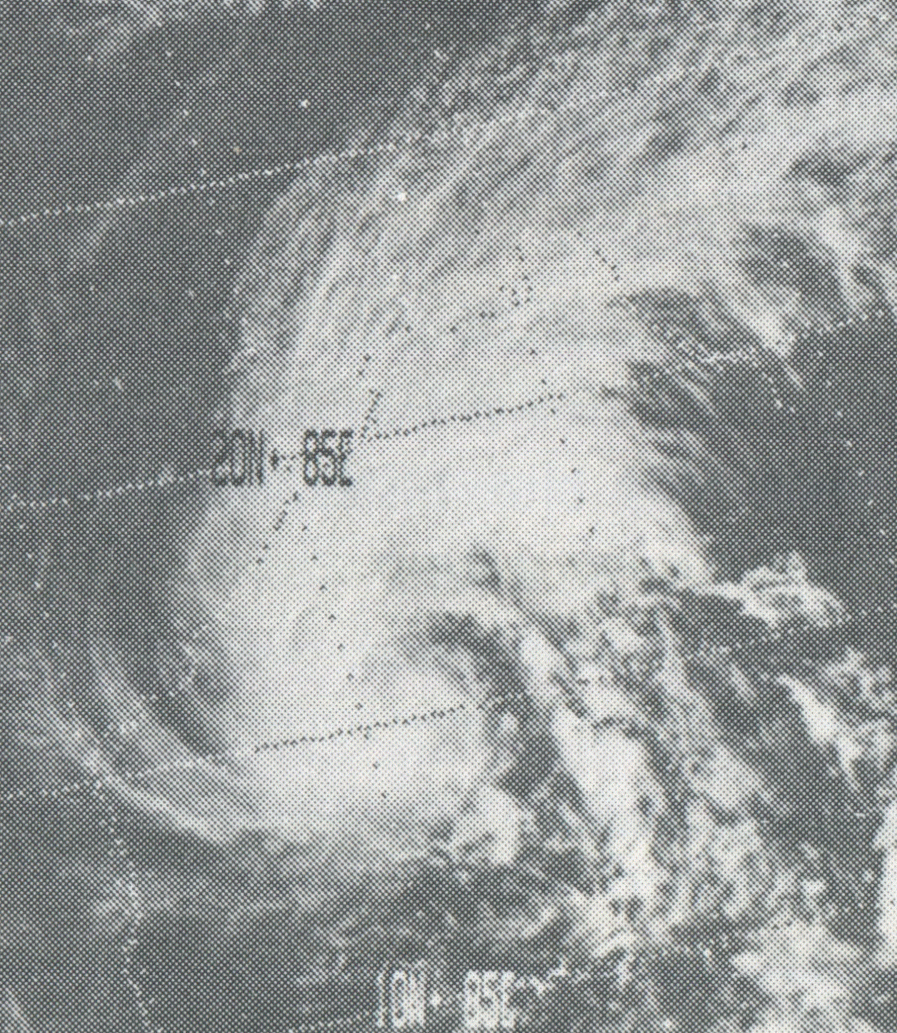
Severe Cyclonic Storm Four

==== 1974 ====
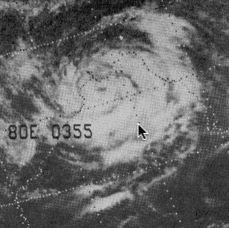
August 1974 Very Severe Cyclonic Storm

==== 1975 ====
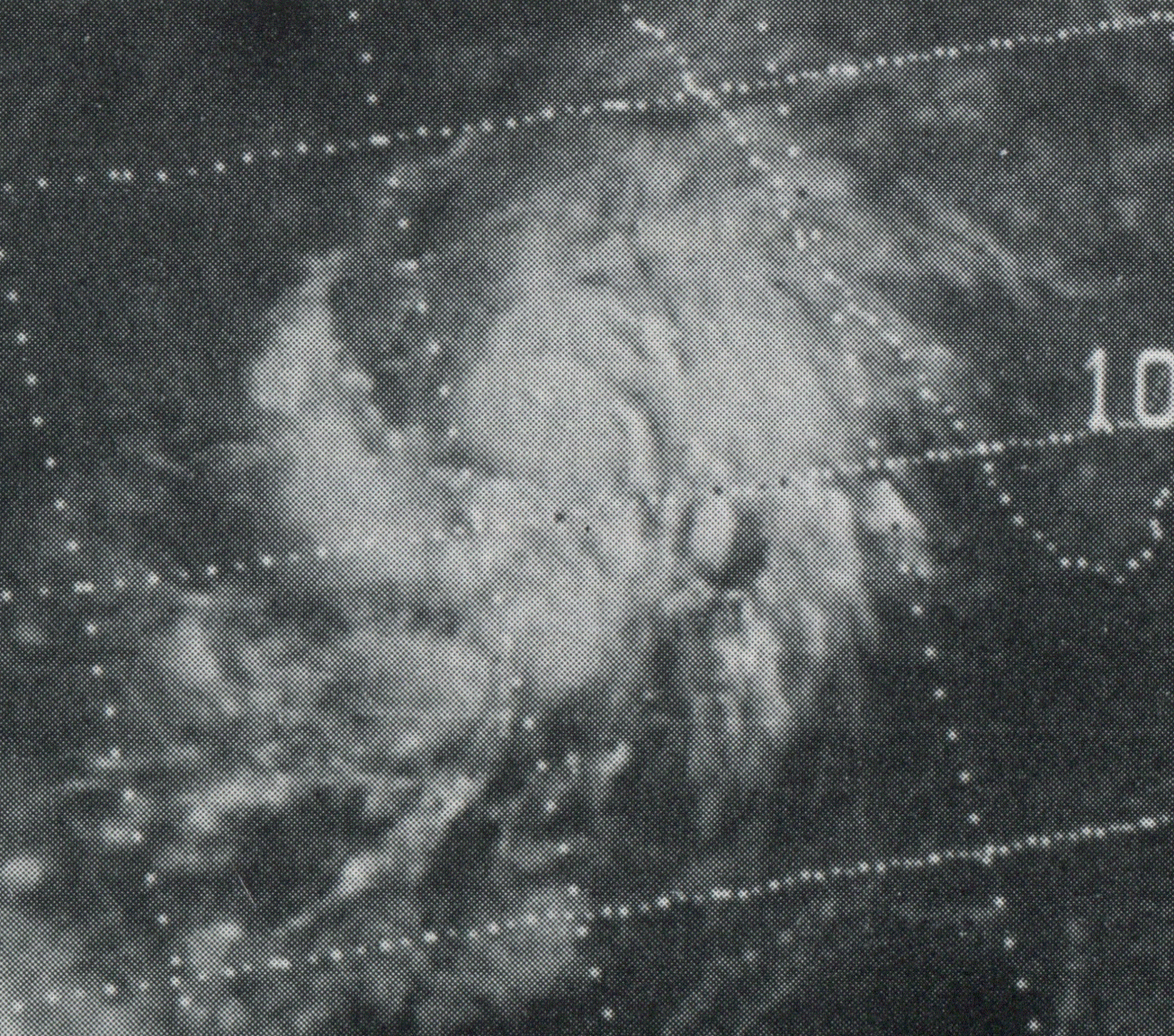
Extremely Severe Cyclonic Storm Two

==== 1976 ====
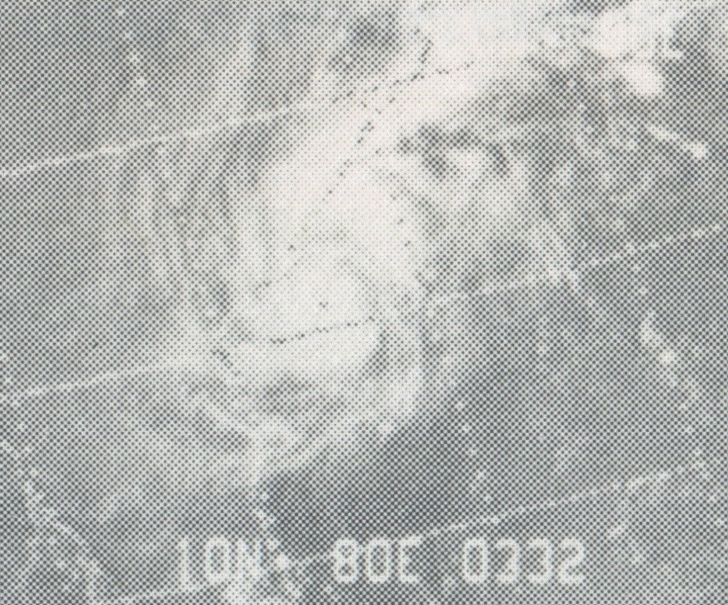
Cyclonic Storm Seven

==== 1977 ====
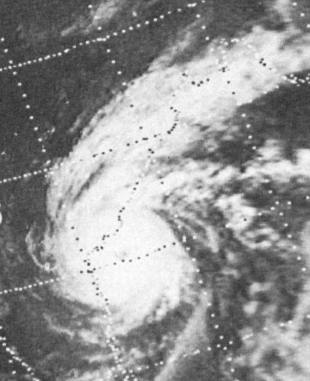
Super Cyclonic Storm 06B

The season was above average, with six cyclones forming with three making landfall over India. The season includes a Super Cyclonic Storm which later became the most intense to make landfall at Andhra Pradesh. The season included two simultaneous cyclones on either side of the North Indian Ocean basin (Bay of Bengal and Arabian Sea) at the same time, the first instance of such incident. The next time this would happen would be in 2018.

- Cyclonic Storm 04B formed in the month of October and hit Kavali in Andhra Pradesh and brought considerable damage to the telegram services, agricultural crops and property. No deaths were reported there.
- Very Severe Cyclonic Storm 05B hit Nagapattinam in Tamil Nadu in the month of November and brought catastrophic damage to the agricultural crops. Nearly 560 people and 23,000 cattle were reported to be died and 10,00,000 people were affected. It made another landfall over Karnataka which became the first and only recorded cyclone to make landfall at that state.
- Super Cyclonic Storm 06B became one of the strongest cyclone to hit Andhra Pradesh since reliable records began in 1891. It hit Chirala on 22 November and became the deadliest cyclone worldwide for this year by killing 10,000 people and 5,00,000 cattle. Storm surge as high as 20 ft. hit the Diviseema Island at the time of landfall. It existed simultaneously with Very Severe Cyclonic Storm 04B at Arabian Sea which became the first simultaneous cyclones recorded in either side of Indian Ocean since records began and the next time to happen like this was on 2018.

==== 1978 ====
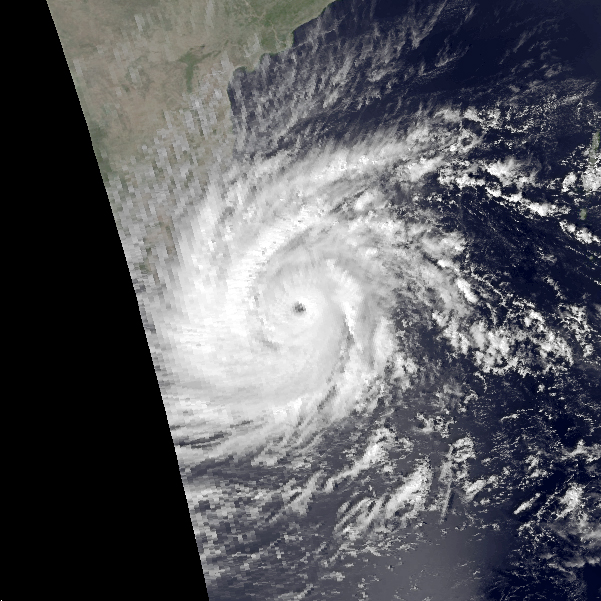
Super Cyclonic Storm 04B

The season was near normal with four cyclones forming and two making landfall over India. The season includes the powerful cyclone to hit Sri Lanka in the month of November and second year in a row to have a Super Cyclonic Storm.

- Super Cyclonic Storm 04B, after making landfall over Sri Lanka, made another landfall near Rameswaram in Tamil Nadu and brought damage to the houses and fishing boats. Overall damage was low in India. Its remnants were tracked into the Arabian Sea where it further travelled up to the coast of Kutch region of Gujarat.

==== 1979 ====
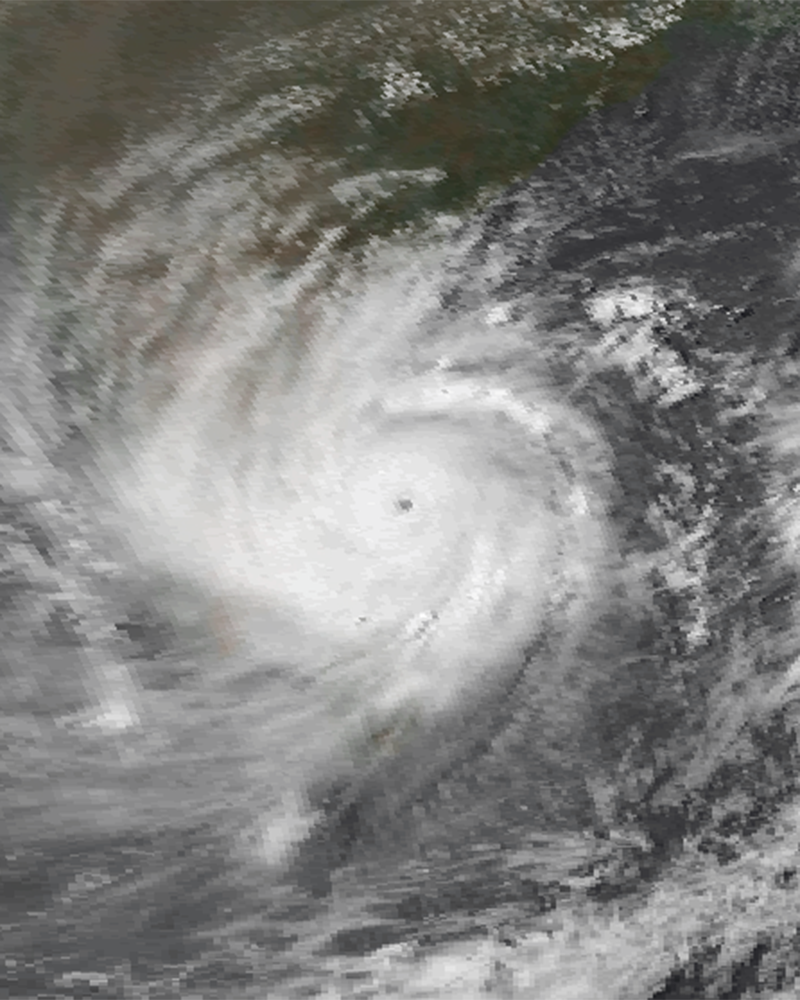
Extremely Severe Cyclonic Storm 01B

The season was above average, with six cyclones forming with two making landfall over India and one threatened the coast.

- Extremely Severe Cyclonic Storm 01B made landfall near Ongole in Andhra Pradesh in the month of May with windspeed of 175 kmph and brought some damage to the state. Nearly 700 people and 300,000 cattle were reported dead. It was the worst storm to hit the state since Super Cyclonic Storm Six (06B) which struck two years prior.

=== 1980s ===
==== 1980 ====
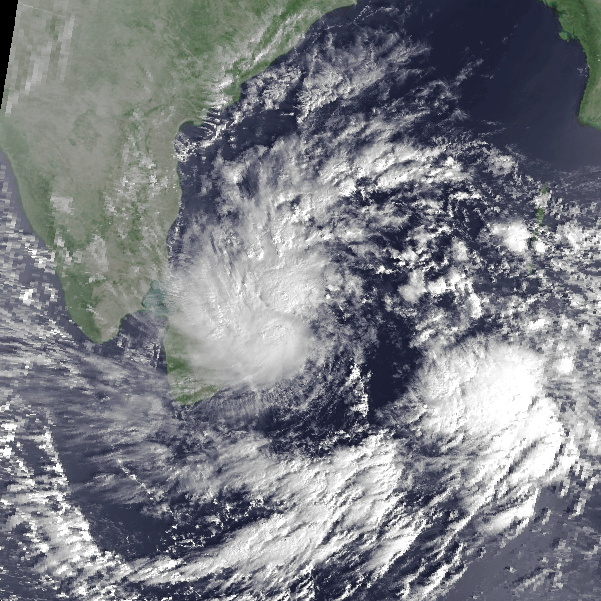
Cyclonic Storm 04B

The season was near normal, with four cyclones forming and one making landfall over India. All the cyclones remained weak in the season as no cyclones intensified further than cyclonic storm.

- Cyclonic Storm 01B skirted Cape Comorin after making landfall over Sri Lanka. No damage or deaths were reported in India.
- Cyclonic Storm 02B made landfall over Andhra Pradesh in the month of October. The extent of damage is not known.
- Cyclonic Storm 04B threatened the coast of Tamil Nadu but well remained offshore. It produced heavy rainfall over there.

==== 1981 ====
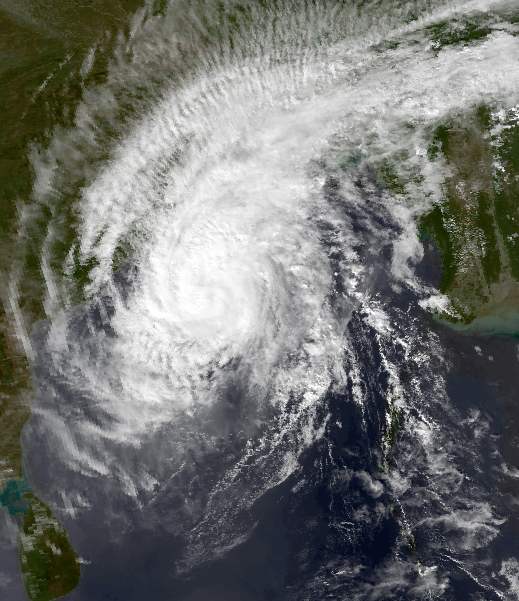
Very Severe Cyclonic Storm 03B

The season was above average, with five cyclones forming and four making landfall over India.

- Two depressions hit the states of Odisha and West Bengal in the months of August and September and brought considerable damage to those states.
- Very Severe Cyclonic Storm 01B made two landfalls over Tamilnadu and Gujarat in the month of November and brought considerable damage there.
- Very Severe Cyclonic Storm 03B skirted the coasts of Odisha and West Bengal in the month of December before making landfall over Bangladesh. It was the latest storm to hit Bangladesh since reliable records began. 200 people were reported to be died in both the nations.

==== 1982 ====
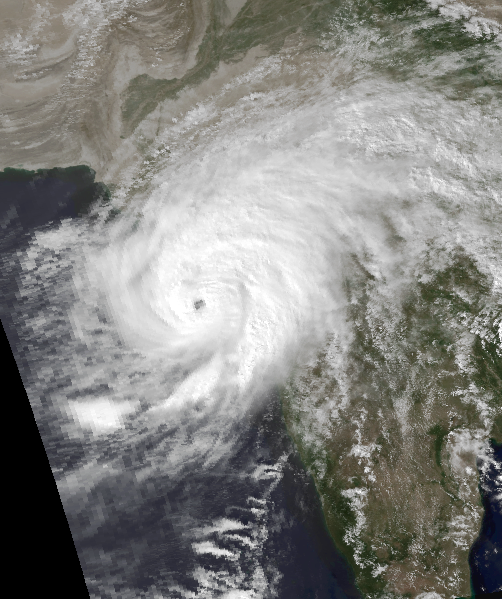
Extremely Severe Cyclonic Storm ARB 01

The season was above average, with five cyclones forming, with all of them making landfall over India.

- Extremely Severe Cyclonic Storm BOB 02 made landfall near Paradip in Odisha in the month of May and killed 150 people. It was the most powerful cyclone to hit the state during the pre-monsoon season until Cyclone Fani in 2019 according to the Indian Meteorological Department .
- Severe Cyclonic Storm BOB 03 and Severe Cyclonic Storm BOB 04 made back-to-back landfall over Andhra Pradesh within a span of a week in the month of October. But damage and deaths attributed by the storms were less.
- Extremely Severe Cyclonic Storm ARB 01 made landfall at Porbandar in Gujarat and brought highest rainfall for the city on record of 120 cm in the month of November. Nearly 340 people were reported to be died due to the storm. It was the latest date for a cyclone in the North Indian Ocean basin to make landfall at the West Coast of India.

==== 1983 ====
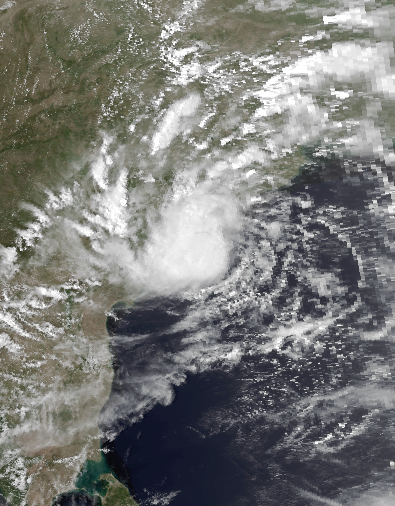
Cyclonic Storm 02B

The season was below average with two cyclones forming and one making landfall over India. The season includes one basin crossover from the West Pacific Ocean named as Tropical Storm Kim as a Deep Depression but haven't intensified further in the basin.

- Cyclonic Storm 02B formed on 1 October and hit Andhra Pradesh coast three days later. The amount of damage and deaths are not known.

==== 1984 ====
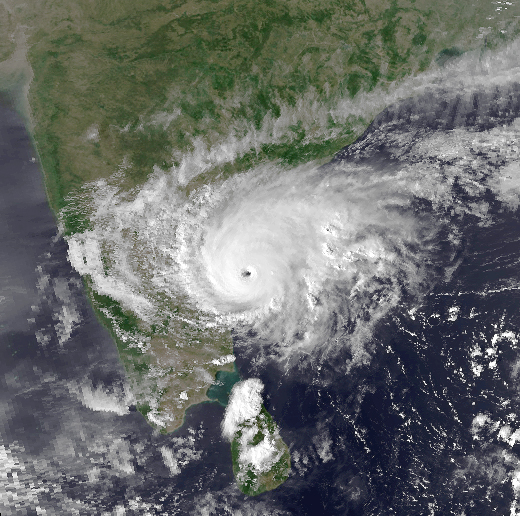
Extremely Severe Cyclonic Storm 03B

The season was near normal with four cyclones forming and three making landfall over India. The season includes the first recorded cyclone to make landfall at Somalia and became the westernmost landfall of a North Indian Ocean cyclone until 2018 Cyclone Sagar.

- Very Severe Cyclonic Storm 02B hit Odisha in the month of September but less damage took place with no deaths reported.
- Extremely Severe Cyclonic Storm 03B made landfall at Sriharikota in Andhra Pradesh in November and brought damage to the state and nearby Tamil Nadu. Nearly 430 people were reported dead.
- Extremely Severe Cyclonic Storm 04B made landfall at Cuddalore in Tamil Nadu in the month of December and brought considerable damage to the agricultural crops.

==== 1985 ====
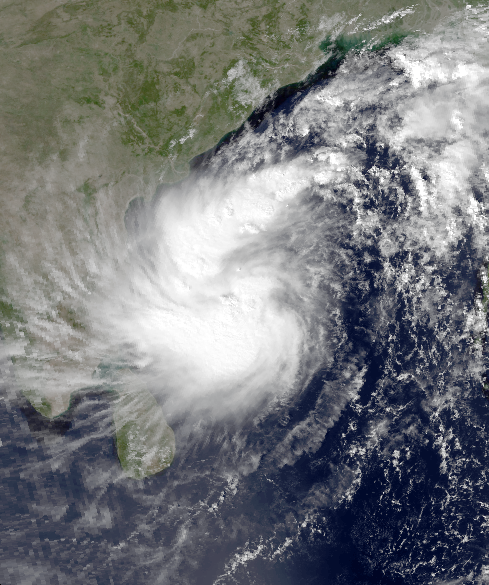
Cyclonic Storm BOB 05

This season was above average, with six cyclones forming and five of them making landfall in India.

- Cyclonic Storm ARB 02 made landfall near Dwarka in Gujarat in the month of June with less damage and no deaths reported.
- Cyclonic Storms BOB 03,05,06 made back-to-back landfall over Andhra Pradesh in the months of October, November and December. The amount of damage and deaths is not known.
- Cyclonic Storm BOB 04 made landfall at Odisha in the month of October killing 38 people there. Storm surge as high as 2 metres hit the coast at the time of landfall which resulted the coastal villages to submerge in sea water for two days.

==== 1986 ====
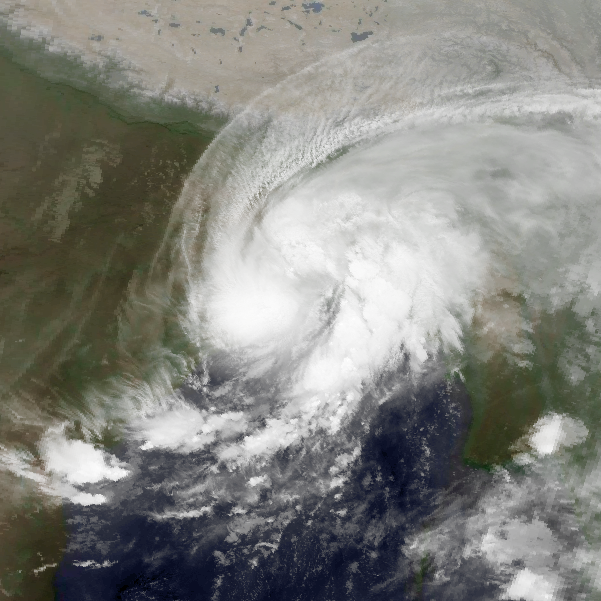
Cyclonic Storm 02B

The season was least active as only one cyclone forming from three systems. The one cyclone itself made landfall over India. It was the second least active in the North Indian Ocean basin next to 1993.

- Cyclonic Storm 02B skirted the coasts of Andhra Pradesh and Odisha before making landfall near the border of India and Bangladesh in the month of November. Neither damage nor deaths were reported in the nation.

==== 1987 ====
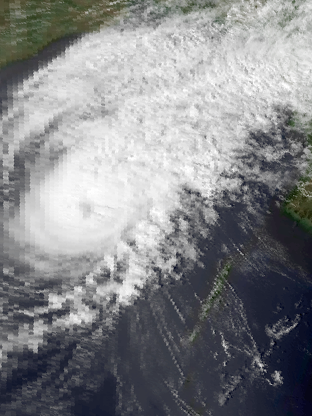
Very Severe Cyclonic Storm One

The season was above average, with five cyclones forming and includes two unofficial storm monitored by the JTWC making a total seven cyclones. Four of them made landfall over India.

- Cyclonic Storm 04B and Severe Cyclonic Storm 06B made back-to-back landfall over the state of Andhra Pradesh in the months of October and November bringing moderate damage over there.
- Severe Cyclonic Storm 05B brought worst damage to the state of Andhra Pradesh which was already affected by the Cyclonic Storm 04B a fortnight ago, killing 50 people and 26,000 cattle.
- Cyclonic Storm 07A made landfall twice over the nation. Once near Tondi as a weak depression and next near Murud-Janjira as a tropical storm. Damage we as to be minimal.

==== 1988 ====
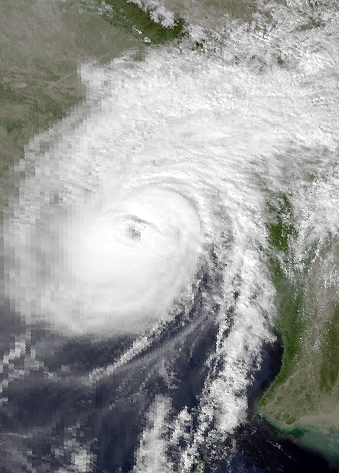
Extremely Severe Cyclonic Storm Four

The season was below average, with three cyclones forming with one making landfall over India.

- Extremely Severe Cyclonic Storm Four made landfall over the Sunderbans in the border of India and Bangladesh and brought worst damage to there. West Bengal reported 220-500 deaths associated with the storm and brought heavy rainfall over Northeast India. But most of the damage was in Bangladesh.

==== 1989 ====
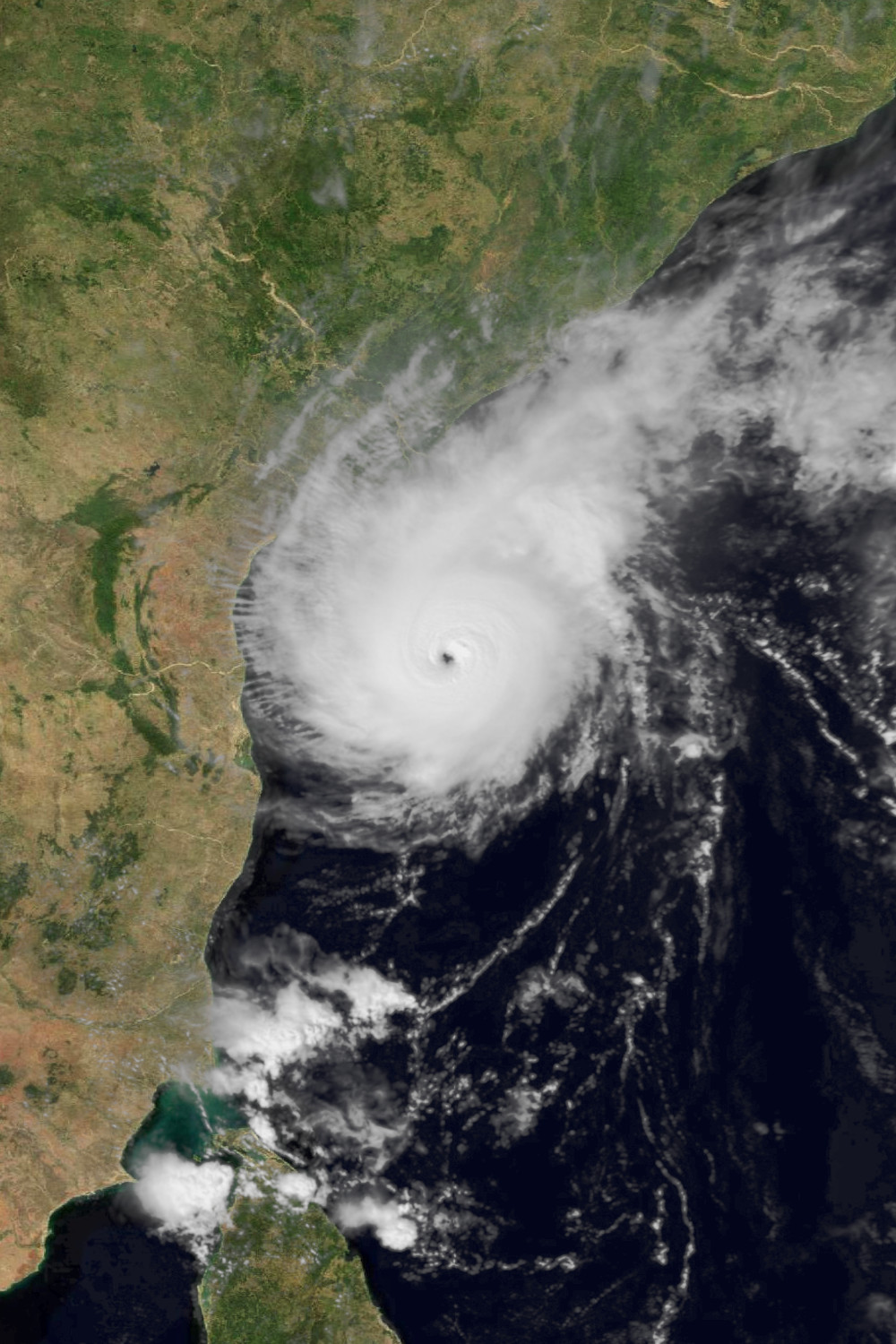
Cyclone Gay

The season was below average with two cyclones forming and includes one cyclone entering the basin from the West Pacific Ocean making a total three cyclones. Out of them, all made landfall over India. It was the first time to have a Super Cyclonic Storm since 1977 and it was first in a row to have a Super Cyclonic Storm.

- Severe Cyclonic Storm BOB 01 made landfall over Odisha in the month of May and brought heavy rainfall over there killing 70 people. Its effects were felt as far as Nepal.
- Cyclonic Storm BOB 05 made landfall over Visakhapatnam in the month of October which became the deadly storm killing near 600 people in flooding over various areas of Andhra Pradesh, Telangana, Maharashtra and Karnataka. Its remnants tracked until the Arabian Sea and maintained its circulation without any regeneration there.
- Super Cyclonic Storm Gay entered the basin from the West Pacific Ocean which became the strongest Indo-Pacific basin crossover since reliable records began in 1891 as a Category 2 equivalent cyclone. Already brought deadly and catastrophic damage to Thailand as a Category 3 Typhoon. It brought hurricane-force winds over Andaman and Nicobar Islands for the first time. The next time to have hurricane-force winds over the islands were in 2013 by Cyclone Lehar. In its existence over Bay of Bengal, it intensified further to a Super Cyclonic Storm and Category 5 equivalent cyclone. Soon it made landfall over Kavali in Andhra Pradesh in its immense strength and its remnants tracked till the coast of Gujarat. But land interaction made the storm to get dissipated by that time. 65 people were killed in India associated with the storm.

=== 1990s ===
==== 1990 ====
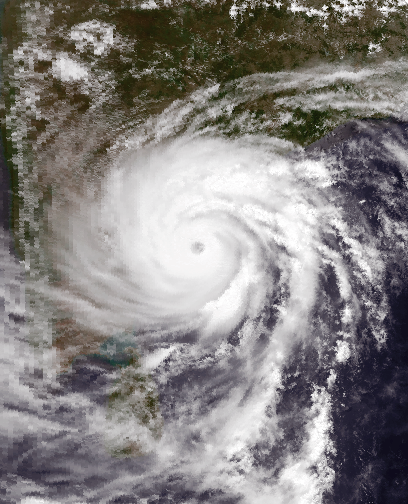
Super Cyclonic Storm BOB 01

The season was below average with two cyclones forming and one making landfall over India. The season includes one Super Cyclonic Storm which was the second consecutive season with this type of storm.

- Super Cyclonic Storm BOB 01 formed on 4 May 1990. It made landfall at the equivalent to a Category 3 tropical cyclone on Andhra Pradesh on 9 May. As it moved inland it weakened and dissipated on 10 May. The cyclone killed 967 people and caused $600 million (1990 USD) in damage. It was the worst storm to hit South India in pre-monsoon season until Cyclone Laila in 2010.
- Deep Depression BOB 07 formed over southern Bay of Bengal, moved northwestward and made landfall on southern Odisha on 3 November. The system caused $110 million in damage and 250 deaths.

==== 1991 ====
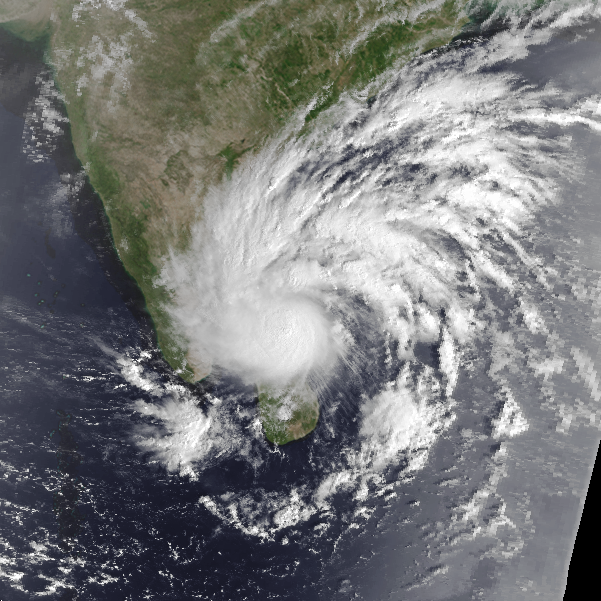
Cyclonic Storm BOB 08

The season was below average with three cyclones forming with one unofficial storm monitored by the JTWC making a total four cyclones but only one makes landfall over India. It was the third and final consecutive season to have a Super Cyclonic Storm.

- Depression BOB 04 formed on 21 August. It made landfall on the same day on the state of Odisha and managed to keep its intensity until dissipating on 26 August.
- Depression BOB 05 formed in the Bay of Bengal on 21 September. It struck Andhra Pradesh and dissipated the next day.
- Depression BOB 07 formed in the Bay of Bengal on 28 October. It made landfall on Tamil Nadu and dissipated on 30 October.
- Cyclonic Storm BOB 08 formed on 9 November. It hit the state of Tamil Nadu on 15 November, and dissipated the next day. The cyclone killed 40 people from flooding. 48 cm of rain fell in Karaikal.

==== 1992 ====
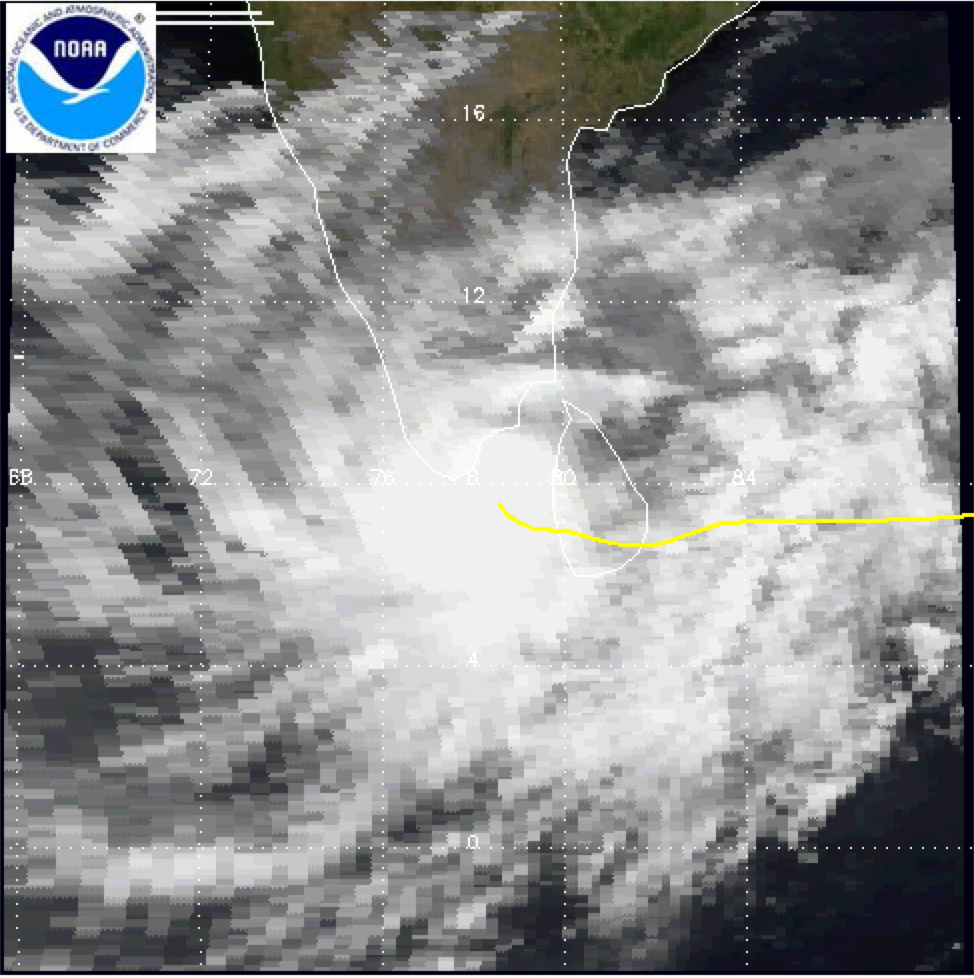
Severe Cyclonic Storm BOB 07

The season was above average with seven cyclones forming and only one making landfall over India. It was earlier one of the most active North Indian Ocean cyclone season on record but at present tied with 2018 and 2019 seasons as most active ever.

- Deep Depression BOB 02 formed on 17 June and made landfall on Odisha later that day. The storm killed 41 people.
- Deep Depression BOB 03 formed on 24 July, a rare date for a cyclone to form. It made landfall on 26 July. It later dissipated inland.
- Deep Depression BOB 04 formed on 6 October. It moved westward and hit India at that intensity and dissipated on the 9th. Overall, it killed 98 people.
- Severe Cyclonic Storm BOB 07 entered the basin on 8 November. After landfall on Sri Lanka, it intensified into a severe cyclonic storm. It finally made landfall as a tropical storm on India on the 17th. The cyclone killed at least 263 people and caused $69 million (1992 USD) in damage.

==== 1993 ====
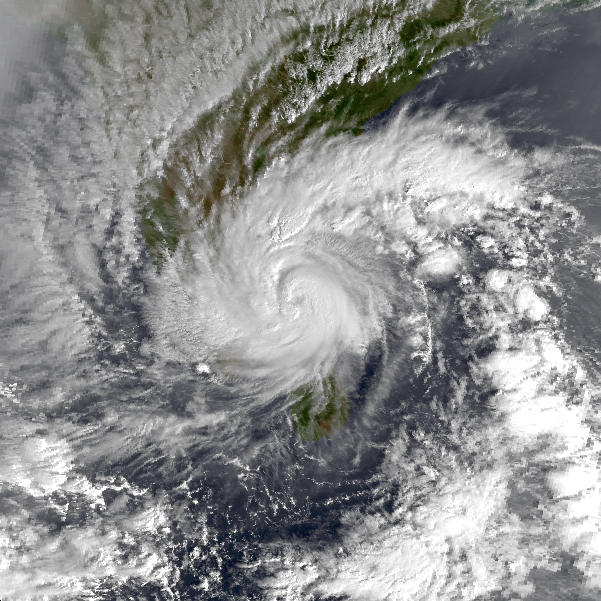
Extremely Severe Cyclonic Storm BOB 02

The season was below average with only two cyclones forming with both of them making landfall over India. The season was least active in the whole North Indian Ocean basin because in overall only four systems formed.

- Very Severe Cyclonic Storm ARB 01/02 formed as a depression southwest of India on 8 November. As a depression, it made landfall on southwestern India and moved northwestward, intensifying into a Very Severe Cyclonic Storm. It dissipated near northwest India. Its landfall as a depression caused 35 deaths.
- Extremely Severe Cyclonic Storm BOB 02 formed on the Bay of Bengal on 1 December. The system gradually moved towards southeast India, making landfall as an Extremely Severe Cyclonic Storm (Category 1 Cyclone) on 4 December. It dissipated on the same day. The system caused $216 million (1993 USD) in damage and killed 70 people.

==== 1994 ====
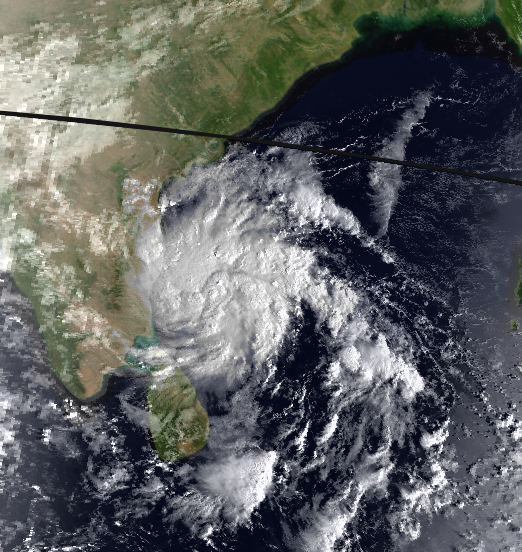
Severe Cyclonic Storm BOB 03

The season was near normal with four cyclones forming and one making landfall over India.

- Severe Cyclonic Storm BOB 03 formed on 29 October. The next day, the IMD upgraded the storm to a severe cyclonic storm. Early on 31 October, the system made landfall near Chennai in southwestern India. It dissipated the same day. The storm killed 304 people and caused $115 million (1994 USD) in damage.

==== 1995 ====
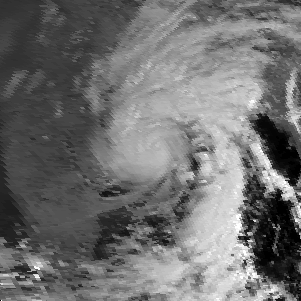
BOB 06 at its peak intensity

The season was near normal with four cyclones forming and two making landfall over India.

- Cyclonic Storm BOB 05 made landfall in West Bengal in the month of October and brought heavy rainfall over there. 50 cm of rainfall fell in Malda associated with the storm.
- Very Severe Cyclonic Storm BOB 06 made landfall close to the border of Andhra Pradesh and Odisha and brought widespread rainfall there. 73 people were reported to be killed by the storm and its remnants led to the deadly snow storm and avalanche in Nepal killing 200 people making a total 290 deaths. The damage from the storm was $40 million.

==== 1996 ====
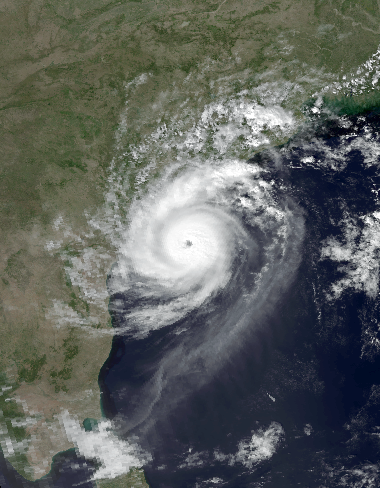
Very Severe Cyclonic Storm BOB 05

The season was above average with five cyclones forming along with one cyclone monitored by the JTWC making a total six cyclones with five of them making landfall over India.

- Cyclonic Storm BOB 02 formed at a very rare location for the month of June at Southeast Bay of Bengal. It skirted the coasts of Tamilnadu and Andhra Pradesh up to 45 km from Nellore and made landfall at Visakhapatnam. Chennai recorded its highest June rainfall of 35 cms. in a single day. 120 deaths in total were reported in India due to the storm.
- Severe Cyclonic Storm ARB 01 made landfall at Gujarat in the month of June, causing considerable damage. 48 people were reported to have died due to the storm.
- Severe Cyclonic Storm ARB 02 tracked a rarest path in the North Indian Ocean on record. Making its first landfall near Sriharikota as a well-marked low pressure area and then intensifying further on reaching the Arabian Sea to become a Severe Cyclonic Storm making a loop off the coast of Gujarat and then moving towards Somalia in southwest direction. It caused worst damage to Rayalaseema region of Andhra Pradesh as a low killing 388 people.
- Very Severe Cyclonic Storm BOB 05 made landfall at Kakinada in the month of November as a Category 4 equivalent tropical cyclone with windspeed of 215 kmph. It brought catastrophic damage to the state killing 1077 people which became deadliest cyclone for the year worldwide. It was the worst storm for the state since 1990 Andhra Pradesh cyclone.
- Very Severe Cyclonic Storm BOB 06 made a rare and long four-day loop in the ocean before making landfall over Tamil Nadu in the month of December. 7 people were killed due to the storm and damage was less than expected.

==== 1997 ====
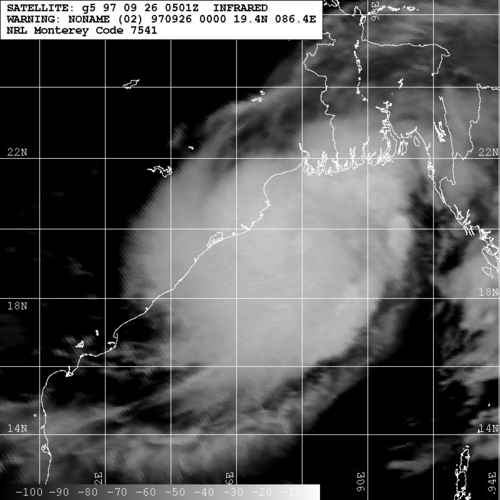
BOB 07 near Odisha Coast

The season was below average with two cyclones forming and includes Tropical Storm Linda which entered the basin from the West Pacific Ocean and an unofficial storm monitored by the JTWC making a total four cyclones. But not even a single cyclone made landfall over India despite the season is in El Nino . But one threatened the coast.

- Severe Cyclonic Storm BOB 07 skirted the coasts of Odisha and West Bengal before making landfall over Bangladesh. Its outer bands brought rainfall in India. Damage to India was relatively less.

==== 1998 ====
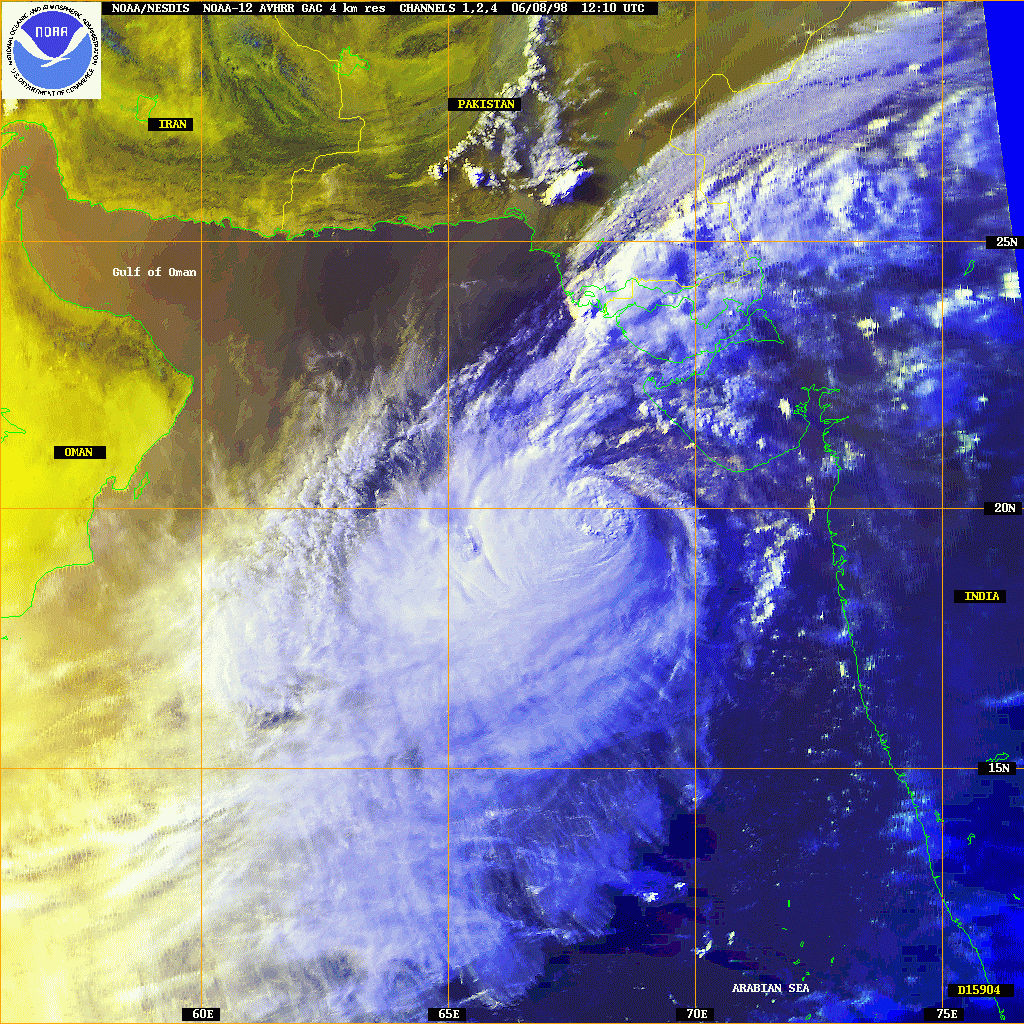
Extremely Severe Cyclonic Storm ARB 02

The season was above average with six cyclones forming and three making landfall over India and one threatened the coast.

- Severe Cyclonic Storm BOB 01 strengthened into a Tropical Cyclone on 18 May. The storm made landfall as an 80 mph Severe Cyclonic Storm. The storm killed 35 people and 504 people were missing in the nation of Bangladesh. It brought heavy rainfall over Northeast India.
- Extremely Severe Cyclonic Storm ARB 02 strengthened into the equivalent of a major hurricane with winds reaching 195 km/h (115 mph) on 9 June before making landfall near Porbandar in the Indian state of Gujarat between 01:00 and 02:00 UTC. 1173 died from the storm and 1774 were reported missing. It was the worst storm to hit Gujarat since 1982.
- Cyclonic Storm ARB 05 brought considerable rainfall over Gujarat. Damage was less expected as it was already affected by Extremely Severe Cyclonic Storm ARB 02. But 250 fishermen were reported to be missing by the storm.
- Deep Depression BOB 03 made landfall in Narsapur, Andhra Pradesh. It brought torrential rainfall for the region, causing 101 fatalities.
- Very Severe Cyclonic Storm BOB 05 made landfall between Kakinada and Visakhapatnam in the month of November and brought damage to agricultural crops. 6 people were killed in Andhra Pradesh.
- Very Severe Cyclonic Storm BOB 06 skirted the coasts of Odisha and West Bengal before making landfall over Bangladesh. But most of the damage was in Bangladesh and only brought little rainfall to India.

==== 1999 ====
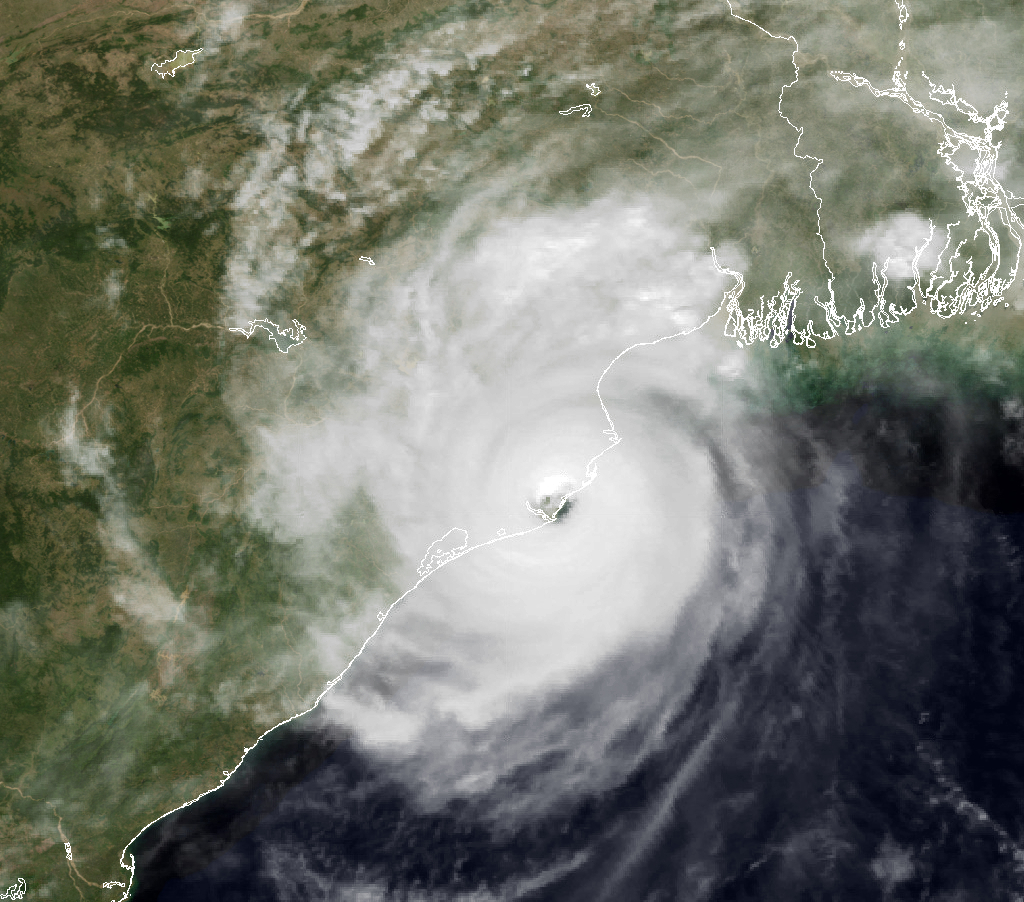
Super Cyclonic Storm BOB 06

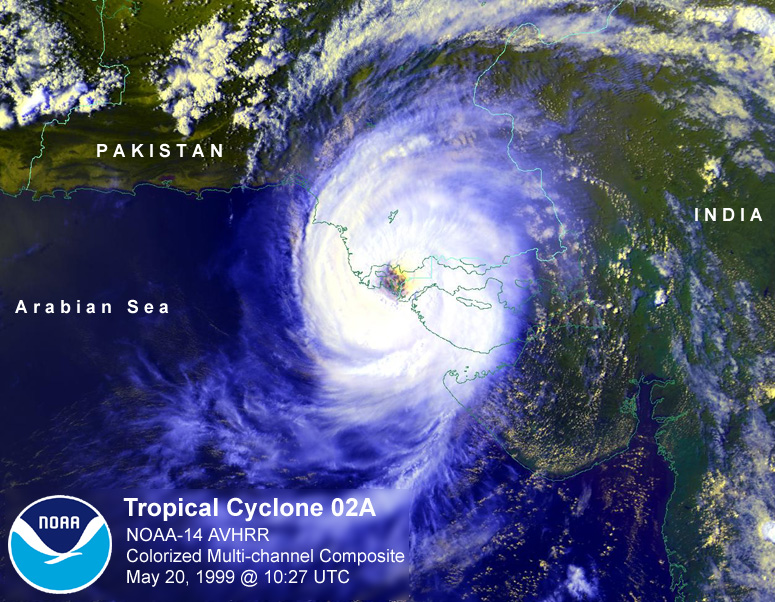
Extremely Severe Cyclonic Storm ARB 01

The season was near normal with four cyclones forming and two making landfall over India. The season includes the most intense cyclone ever recorded in North Indian Ocean basin on record.

- Extremely Severe Cyclonic Storm ARB 01 affected India along with Pakistan. The maximum wind intensity of the storm was 195 km/h (120 mph) and the minimum pressure was 946 hPa (27.94 inHg).
- Tropical Storm 03B had affected eastern India and its damage and death report is unknown. It was unofficially monitored by JTWC.
- Deep Depression BOB 02 formed on 17 June and made landfall in Berhampur, however it was considered as a monsoonal depression by IMD.
- Deep Depression BOB 03 formed on 27 July which was weak depression with minimal damage.
- Depression BOB 04 formed on 6 August which made landfall in the state of Odisha.
- Extremely Severe Cyclonic Storm BOB 05 and the Super Cyclonic Storm BOB 06 made back-to-back over Odisha in the month of October killing more than 15,000 people. The latter one remains the most powerful cyclone to form in overall North Indian Ocean basin on record with windspeed of 260 km/h (160 mph) and 912 hPa (26.93 inHg).

=== 2000s ===
==== 2000 ====
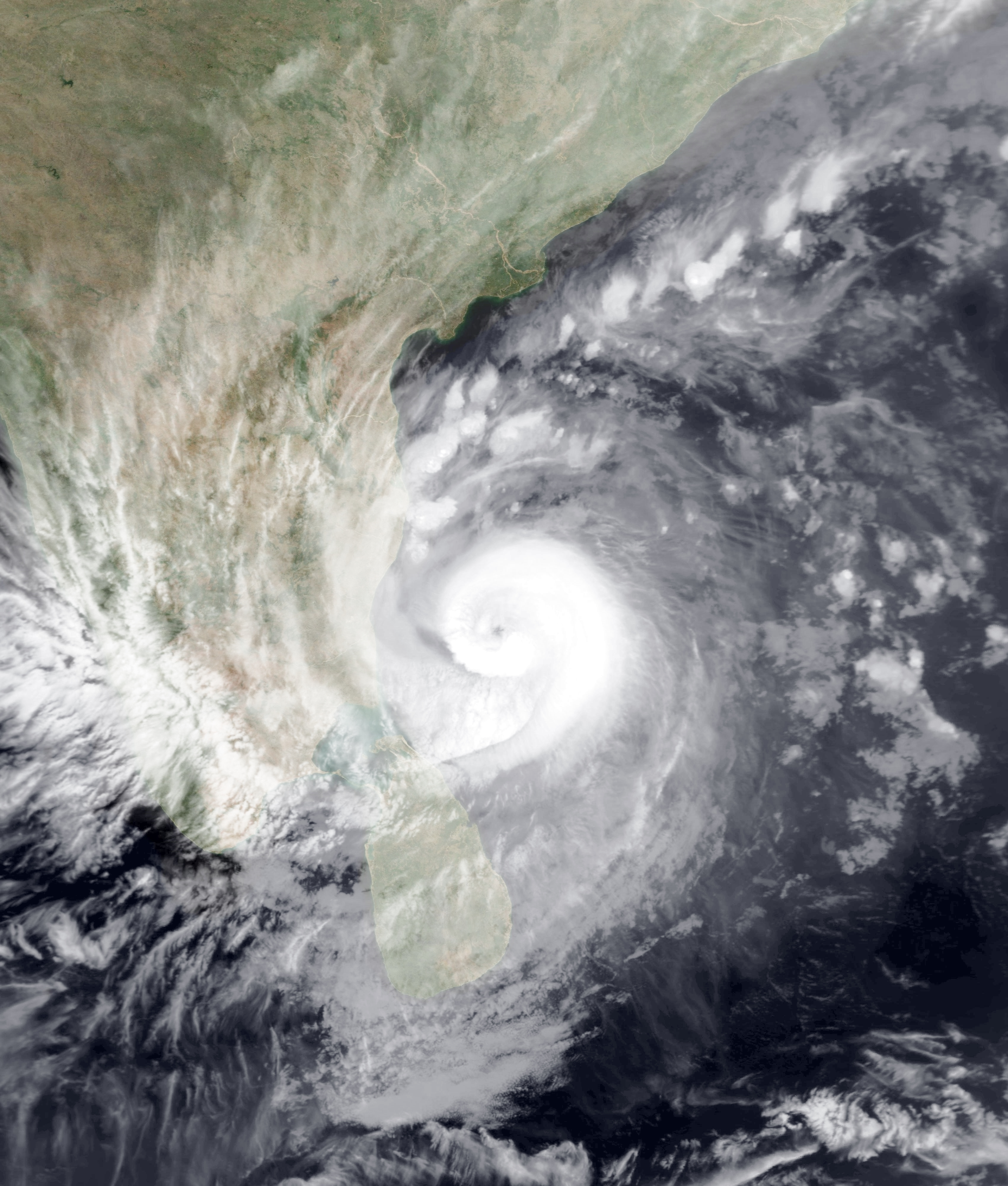
Extremely Severe Cyclonic Storm BOB 05

The season was above average with five cyclones forming with two making Indian landfall and one threatening the coast of India.

- Depression BOB 02 impacted Andhra Pradesh and caused massive and widespread flooding and destruction of crops.
- Cyclonic Storm BOB 03 formed on 15 October and dissipated before landfall. The remnants brought heavy rainfall in Andhra Pradesh and resulted in death of 100 pelican chicks.
- Cyclonic Storm BOB 04 made landfall in Bangladesh and brought heavy rainfall to North East India
- Extremely Severe Cyclonic Storm BOB 05 impacted Tamil Nadu on 29 November, resulting in 12 deaths and brought widespread rainfall.
- Extremely Severe Cyclonic Storm BOB 06 brought heavy rainfall to Southern India and the damage was minimal.

==== 2001 ====
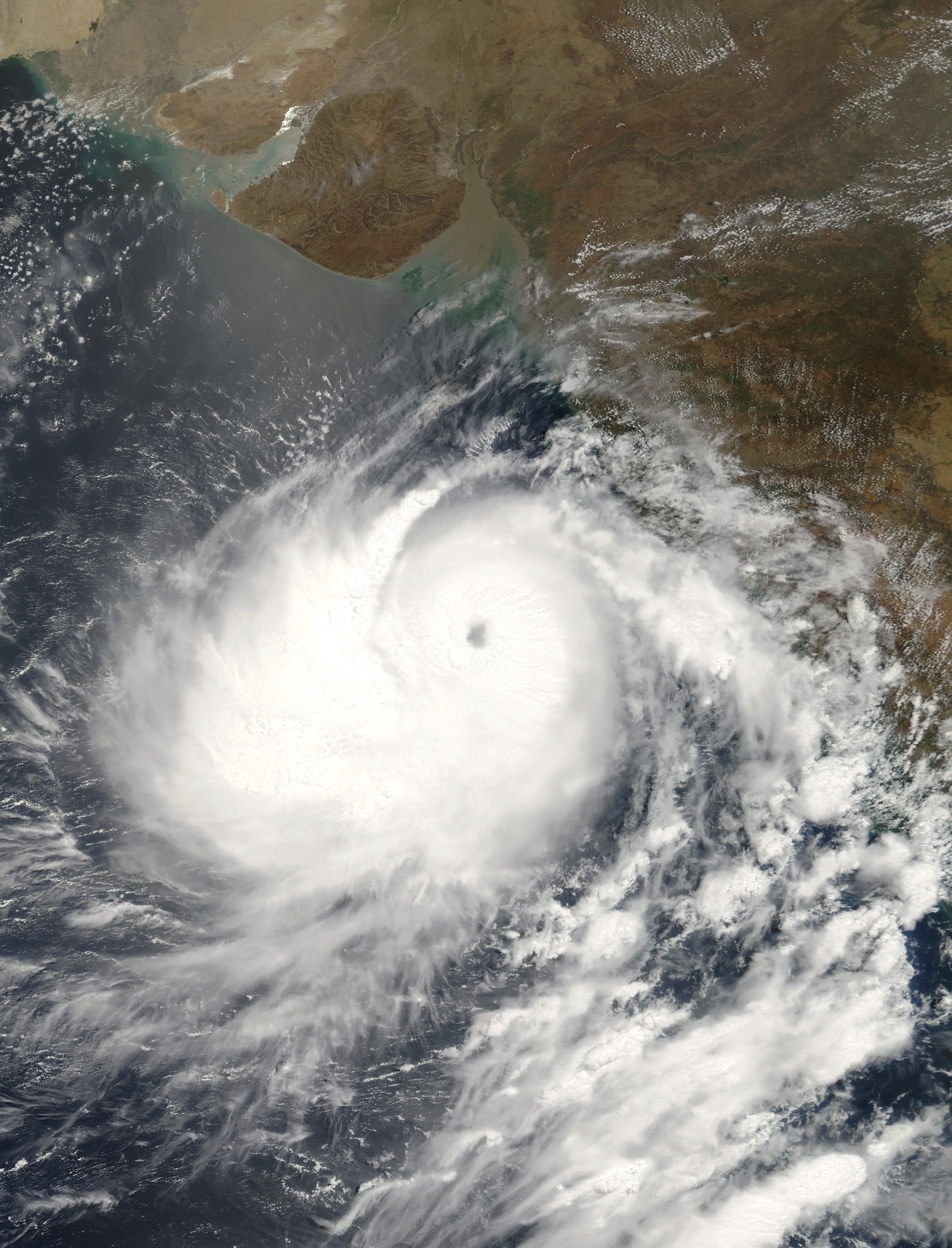
Extremely Severe Cyclonic Storm ARB 01

The season was above average with four cyclones forming with one Tropical Storm Vamei entering from the West Pacific Ocean making a total of five cyclones. But only one makes landfall over India and another threatening the coast.

- Extremely Severe Cyclonic Storm ARB 01 formed in Arabian Sea on 21st of May and impacted the Indian state of Gujarat as a weakening storm. Damage was minimal but nearly 1,000 fishermen were feared to be lost in the storm.
- Cyclonic Storms ARB 02 and 03 brought considerable rainfall over Gujarat but damage was minimal.
- Depression BOB 01 made landfall near Paradip on 12 June. It dropped heavy rainfall on its path
- Cyclonic Storm BOB 02 formed on 14 October in Bay of Bengal and made landfall near Nellore. While moving ashore, the storm dropped heavy rainfall in Andhra Pradesh and extending into Tamil Nadu, causing floods in some areas for the first time in 40 years. It also caused worst flooding over Kadapa by killing more than 100 people.
- Depression BOB 03 also impacted East India. 150mm of rainfall was recorded in Paradip.

==== 2002 ====
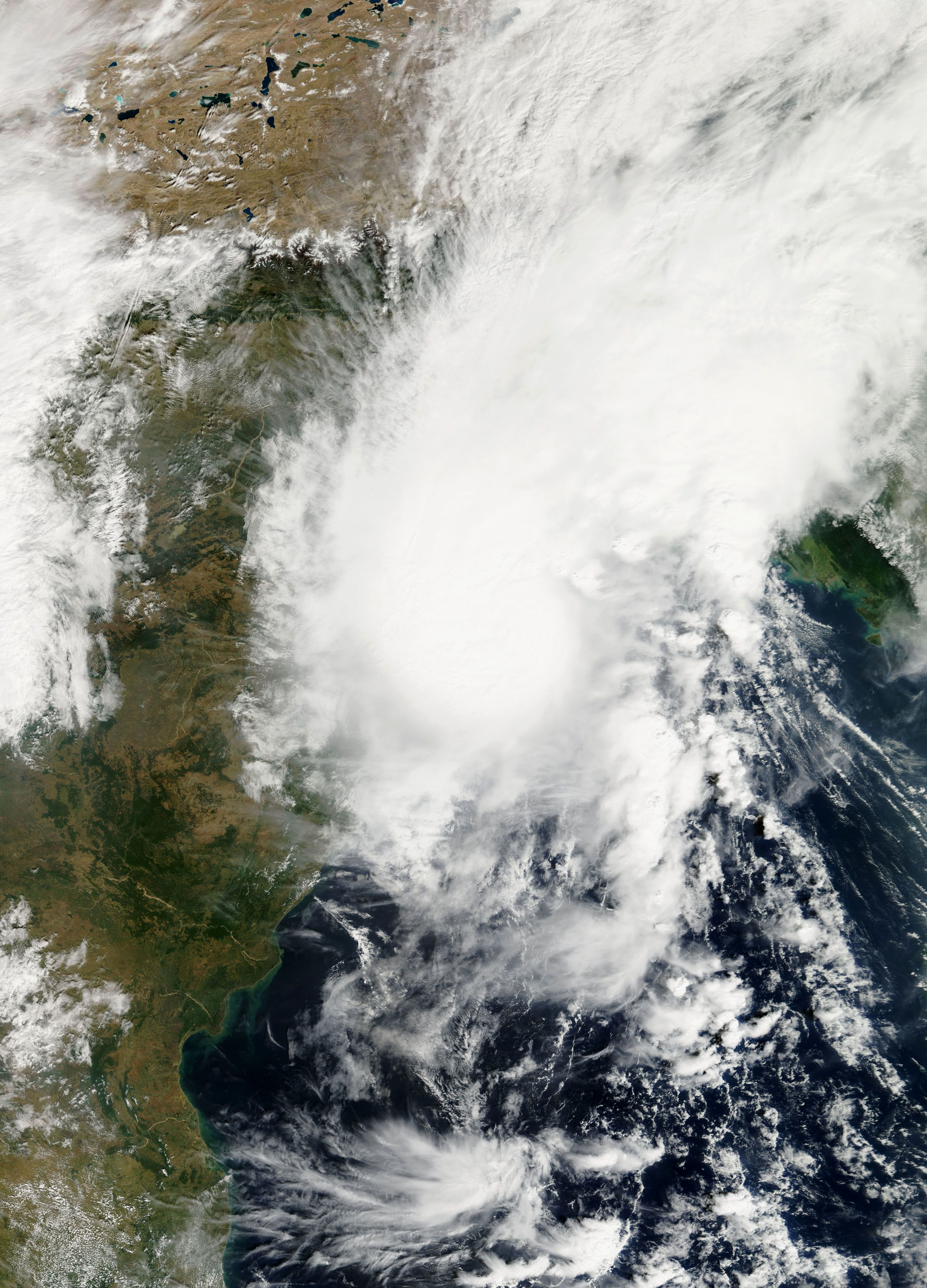
Severe Cyclonic Storm BOB 03

The season was near normal with four cyclones forming and one making landfall over India.

- Depression BOB 02 formed on 23rd of October and remained quasi-stationary near Andhra Pradesh coast. It caused rainfall in Eastern India and no damage was reported.
- Severe Cyclonic Storm BOB 03 impacted West Bengal on 12th of November resulting in 173 deaths. It caused damage to Bangladesh and India.

==== 2003 ====
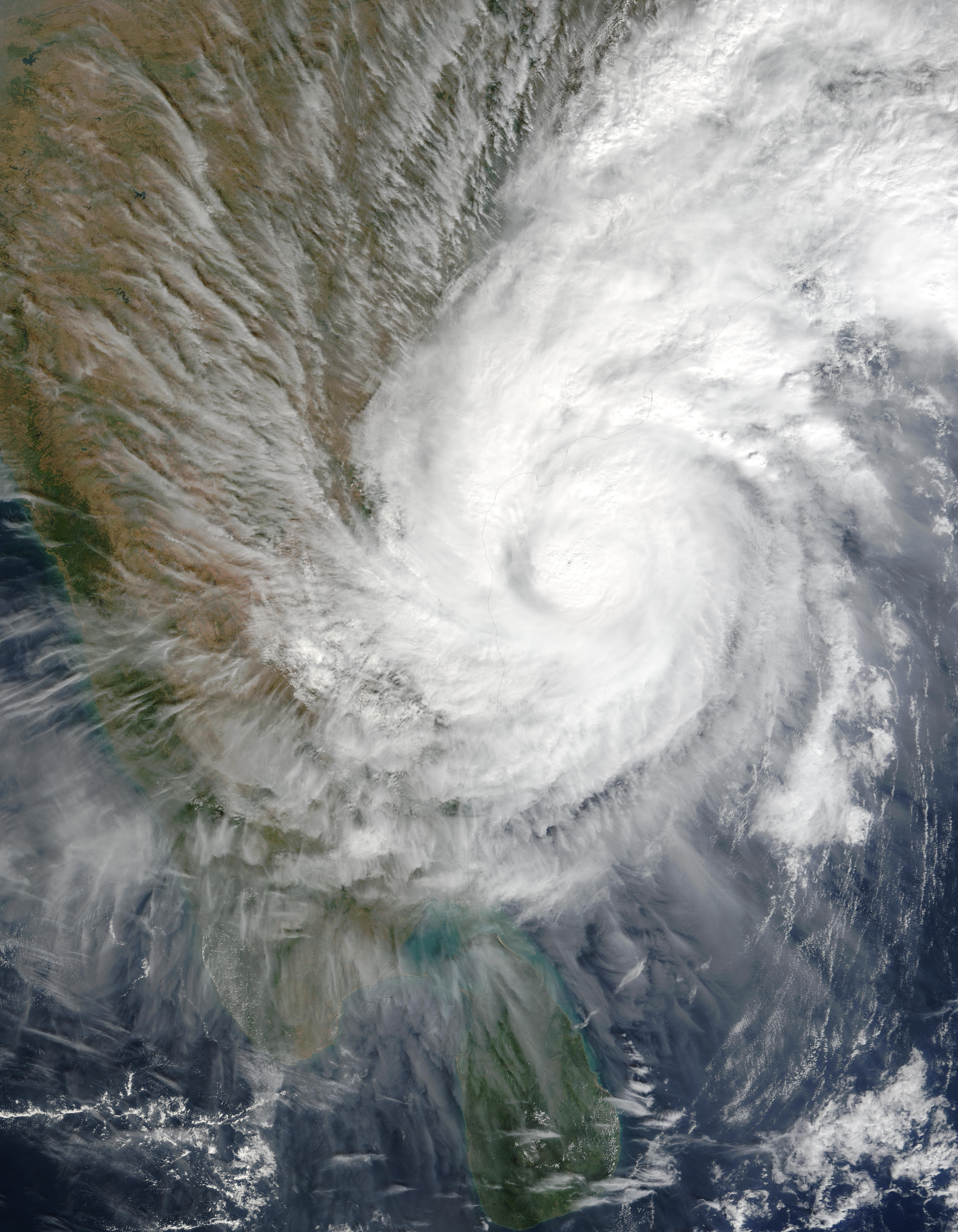
BOB 07 about to make landfall

The season was below normal with three cyclones forming with one making landfall over India. Another storm threatened the coast of India. It was the last season to have unnamed cyclones in the North Indian Ocean basin.

- Very Severe Cyclonic Storm BOB 01 brought little rainfall to the Andaman and Nicobar Islands but worsened the condition of the heatwave over South India. It resulted in a deadly heatwave outbreak killing 1500 people as it moved away from the Indian coast and hit Myanmar. Due to the heatwave, Chennai recorded its highest maximum temperature in record of 45 °C.
- Severe Cyclonic Storm BOB 07 attacked Diviseema in Andhra Pradesh in December which brought widespread rainfall and agricultural crop damage. 85 people were killed by the floods associated with the storm.

==== 2004 ====
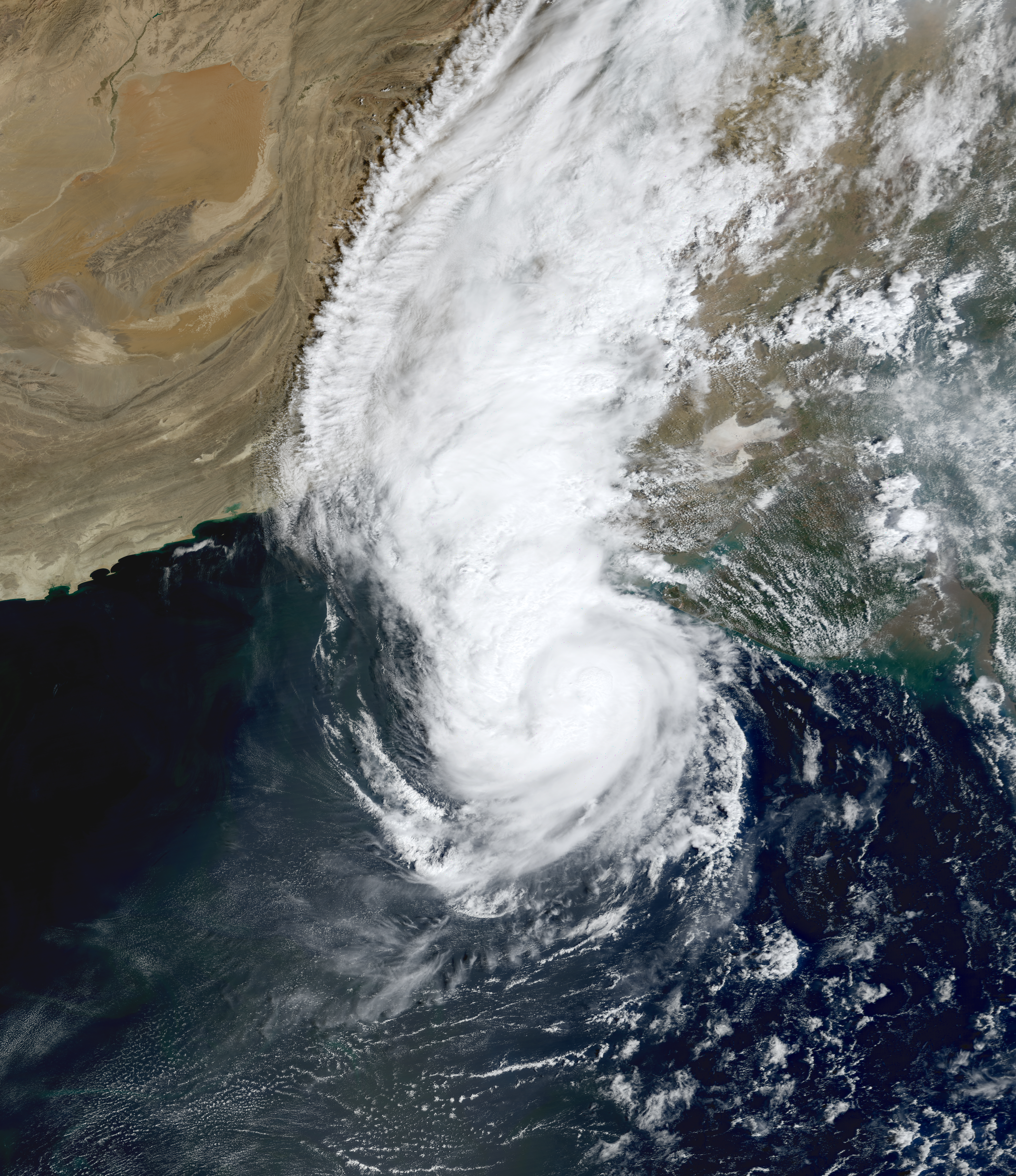
Cyclone Onil

The season was near normal with four cyclones forming and not even a single cyclone making landfall over India. However, two cyclones threatened the coast of India. This was the first season when the naming of storms over the North Indian Ocean basin began, with Cyclone Onil formed in September.

- Severe Cyclonic Storm ARB 01 brought heavy rainfall over Kerala, Karnataka and Goa which later became the first cyclone to directly threaten Kerala since records began in 1891. It also brought torrential rainfall over Lakshadweep Islands and killed nine people. 230 cm of rainfall fell over the island of Amindivi which became second wettest storm in North Indian Ocean basin and 15th wettest storm worldwide on record.
- Severe Cyclonic Storm Onil became the first named storm in the North Indian Ocean basin on record which formed in the month of September. It skirted the coast of Gujarat and brought considerable rainfall there. Nearly 900 fishermens were feared to have lost in the storm. It brought little damage to nearby Pakistan.

==== 2005 ====
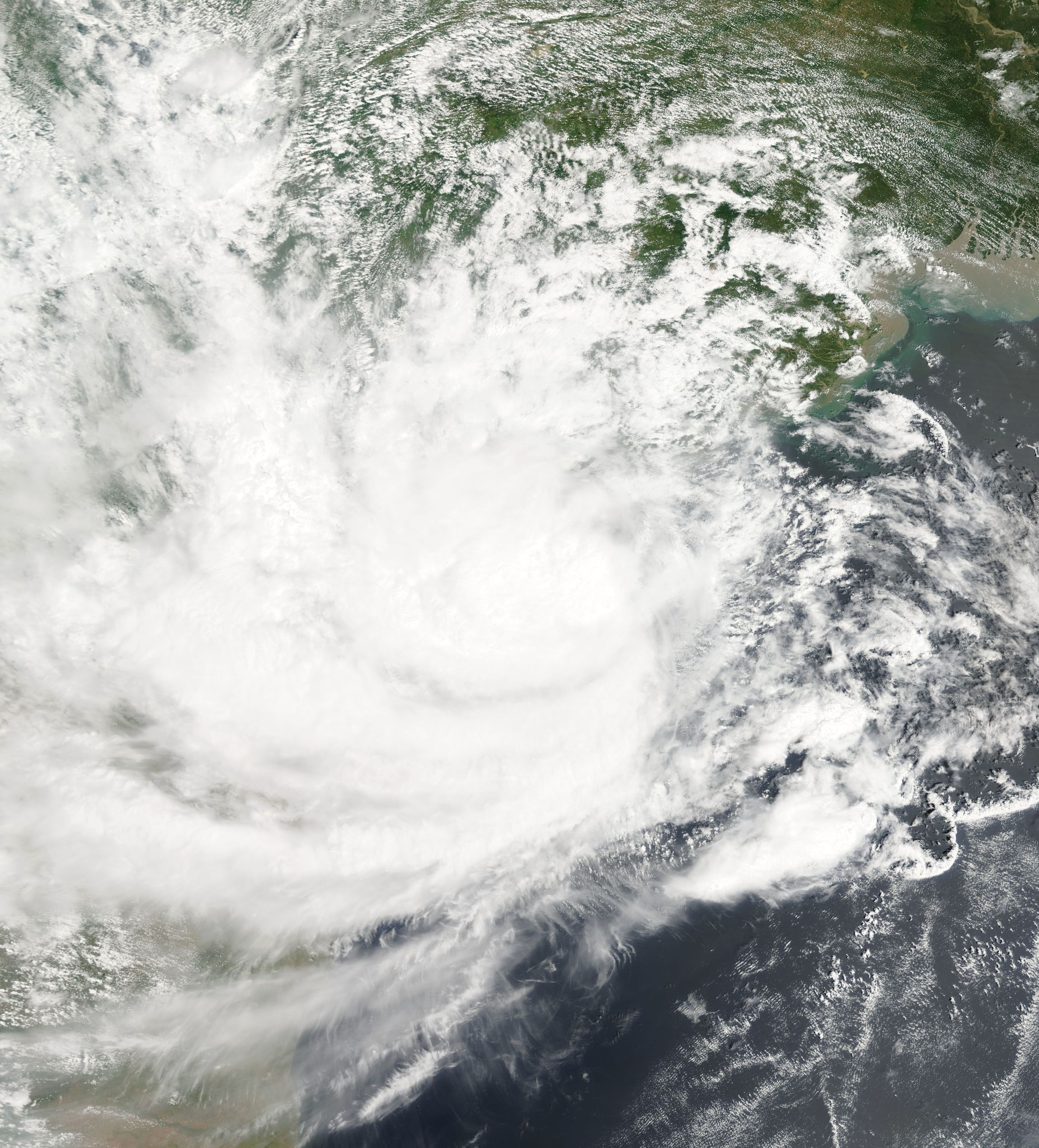
Cyclone Pyarr

The season was near normal with four cyclones forming and three making landfall over India. This season was the first instance when there were no cyclones intensified further than Cyclonic Storm. The other season to do so was 2012.

- Cyclonic Storm Pyarr tracked a rare path from northeast to southwest in the month of September in the Bay of Bengal and made landfall over Kalingapatnam in Andhra Pradesh. It killed 65 people in Andhra and adjoining Odisha.
- Cyclonic Storm Baaz and Cyclonic Storm Fanoos made back-to-back landfall over Tamil Nadu and adjoining Puducherry which brought widespread rainfall over there. Cyclone Baaz killed 11 people but damage from Cyclone Fanoos and Baaz was minimal. There were agricultural crop damage too.

==== 2006 ====
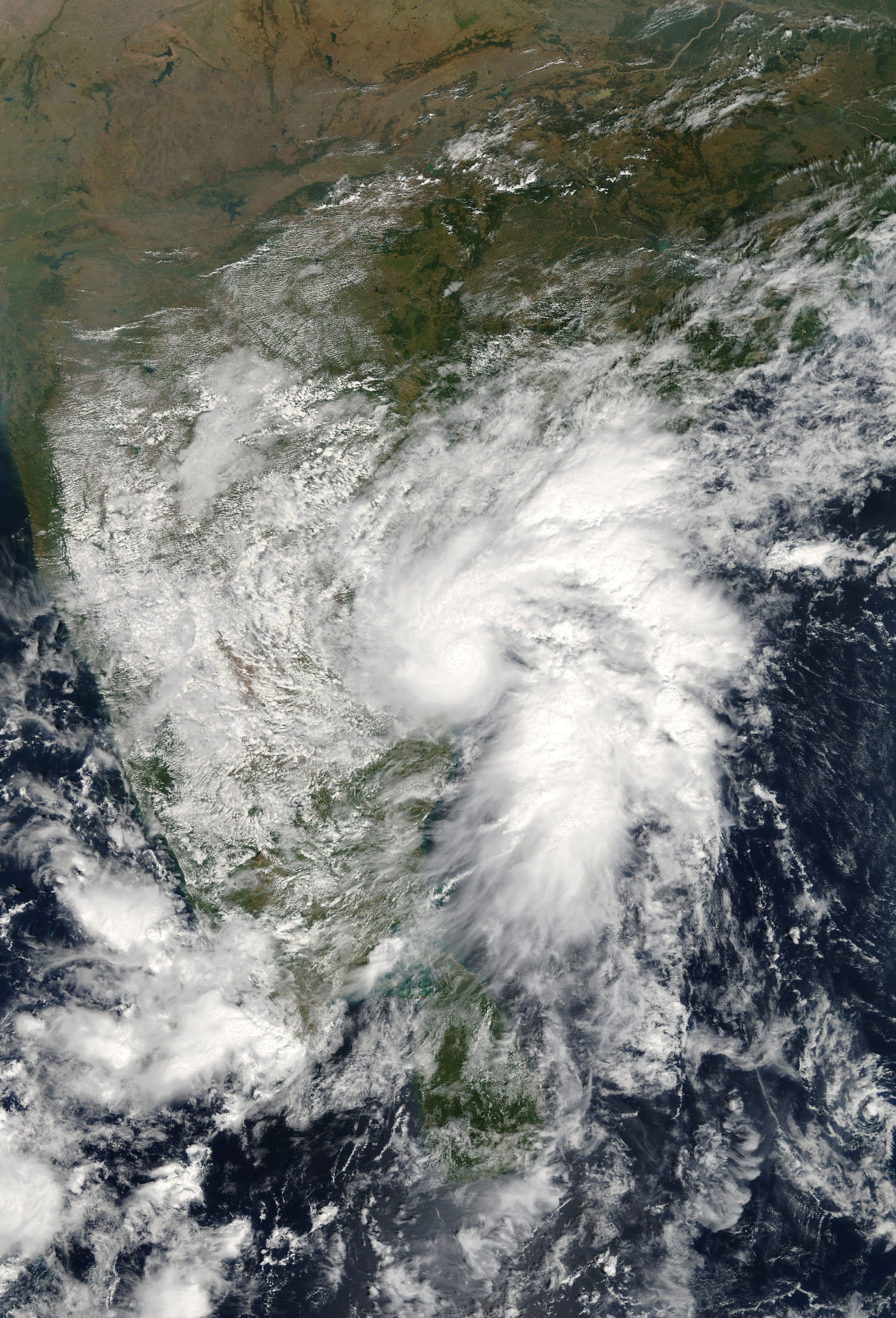
Cyclone Ogni

The season was below average with three cyclones forming but only one making landfall over India.

- Deep depression BOB 02 affected eastern India and damage was unknown.
- Severe Cyclonic Storm Mukda looped off the coast of Gujarat in the month of September and brought considerable and beneficial rains.
- Cyclonic Storm Ogni became the smallest cyclone on record in the North Indian Ocean basin, with 85 km in diameter. It hit Ongole in Andhra Pradesh on 29 October and made damage to the agricultural crops.

==== 2007 ====
The season was near normal with four cyclones forming but the season has no Indian landfall. But depressions formed in this season were the deadliest. It saw the first Super Cyclonic Storm in the basin since 1999 and the first to ever record in the Arabian Sea. It was also the first time to have two category 5 equivalent cyclone in one minute mean in a single season.

- Cyclonic Storm Yemyin formed over Bay of Bengal and made landfall over Machilipatnam in the month of June as a Deep Depression and brought widespread floods over Andhra Pradesh, Telangana, Karnataka, Maharashtra and Gujarat killing 150 people. This was because the storm maintained its intensity and crossed into the Arabian Sea where it intensified further into a Cyclonic Storm and brought catastrophic damage over Pakistan which was the first cyclone to hit the nation since 1999.
- Depressions and Deep Depressions BOB 04, 05, 06, 07, 08 which formed in the months from July to November brought damage over India killing many people.
- Extremely Severe Cyclonic Storm Sidr resulted in a northeast monsoon failure over Chennai and adjoining areas of South Karnataka, Rayalaseema and Coastal Andhra regions as it moved away from India and hit Bangladesh in the month of November killing 15000 people which became the deadliest cyclone worldwide for the year 2007.

==== 2008 ====
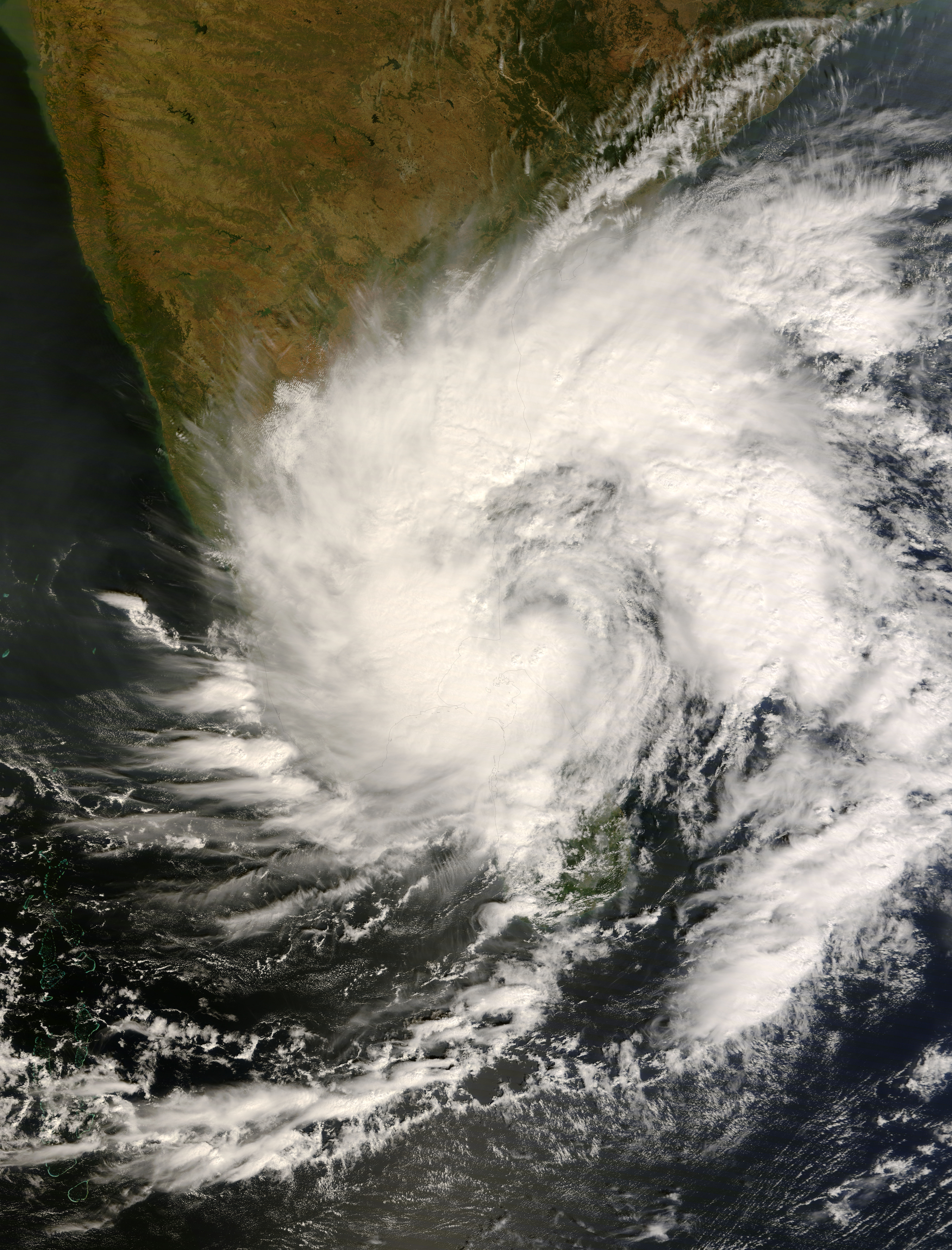
Cyclone Nisha about to make landfall

The season was near normal with four cyclones forming and two making landfall over India.

- Cyclonic Storm Rashmi after making landfall over Bangladesh entered into India and brought heavy rainfall and deadly landslides over Northeast India killing 20 people in those places.
- Cyclonic Storm Khai-Muk made landfall over Kavali in Andhra Pradesh bringing heavy rainfall and severe agricultural crop damage in Coastal Andhra districts.
- Cyclonic Storm Nisha made landfall over Cuddalore in the month of December and brought catastrophic damage over Tamil Nadu and Sri Lanka. Nearly 200 people were killed by this storm and remains the 10th wettest storm in the Indian Ocean basin on record. 69 cm of rainfall fell over the town of Orathanadu in Thanjavur District which was highest single day rainfall from a cyclone in South India at that time later surpassed by Cyclone Phyan which formed in next year.

==== 2009 ====
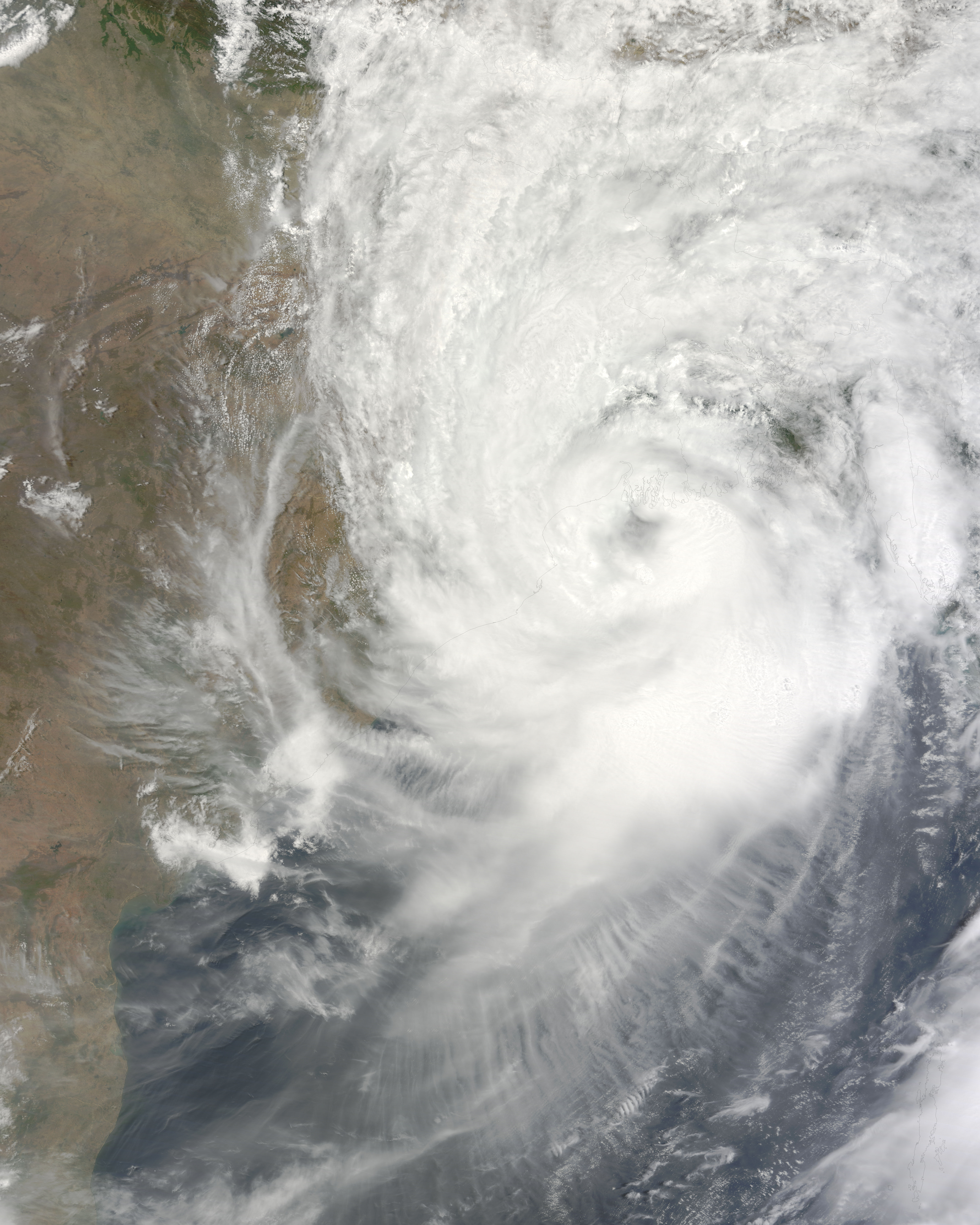
Cyclone Aila

The season was near normal with four cyclones forming with two making landfall over India.

- Cyclonic Storm Bijli skirted the coast of Odisha and West Bengal in the month of April which later became the ninth wettest tropical cyclone in India.
- Severe Cyclonic Storm Aila formed on 23 May and made landfall in the state of West Bengal on 25 May. It caused 149 fatalities and more than 100,000 people left homeless and the damage cost was US$1 billion. It was the worst cyclone after Cyclone Sidr.
- Depression ARB 01 formed on 23 June and made landfall in the state of Gujarat. It killed nine people due to lightning.
- Depression ARB 02 formed on 25 June and made landfall in the state of Gujarat. It caused heavy rainfall.
- Deep Depression BOB 03 formed on 20 July and made landfall in Digha, West Bengal. It caused 43 fatalities in Odisha.
- Deep Depression BOB 04 formed on 4 September and made landfall in Digha. One person was reportedly drowned due to high sea current.
- Cyclonic Storm Phyan formed on 4 November and made landfall in Pune in Maharashtra. It became the fifth wettest tropical cyclone in India.

=== 2010s ===
==== 2010 ====
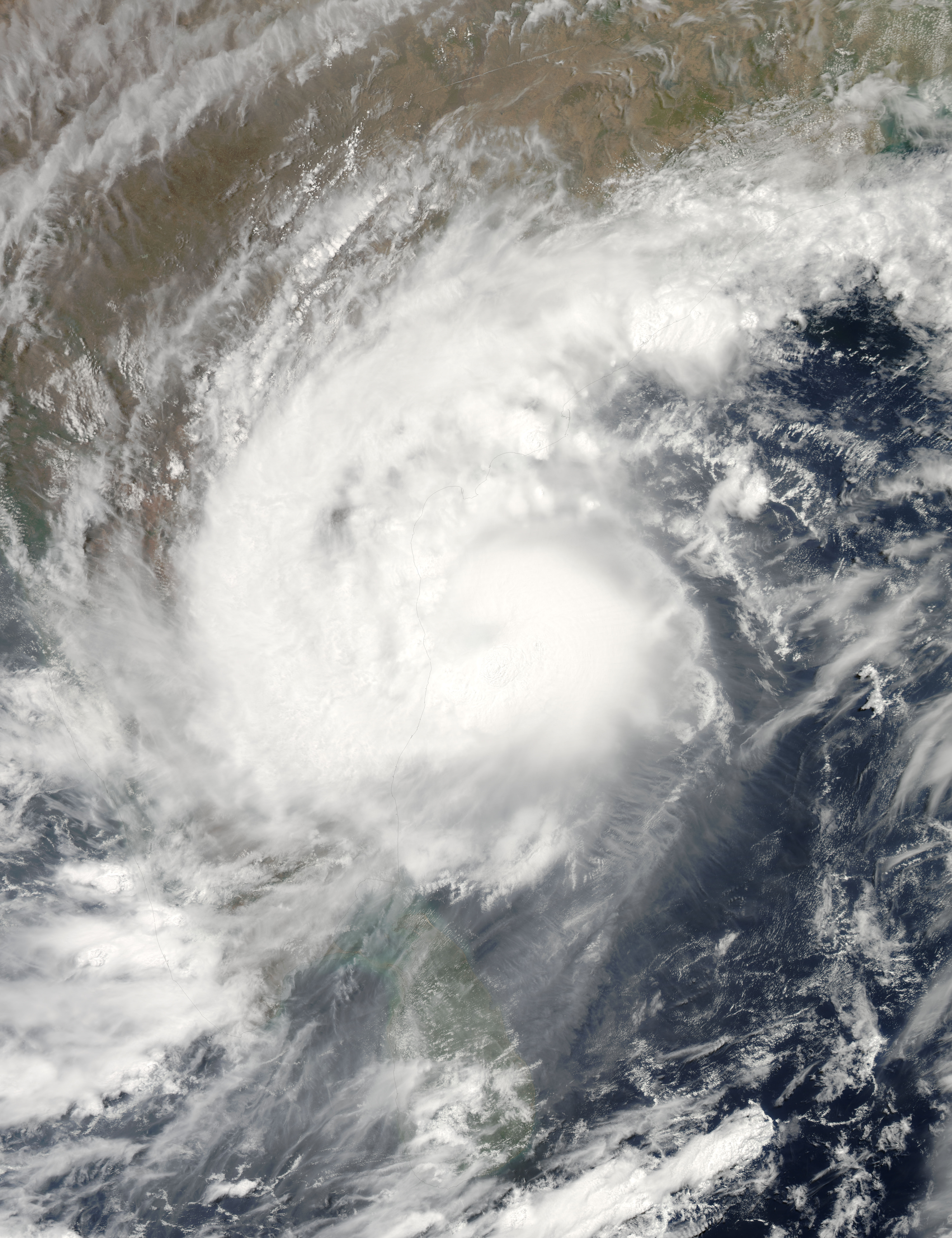
Cyclone Laila

The season was above average with five cyclones forming with two Indian landfall. The above average activity was influenced by the La Nina.

- Severe Cyclonic Storm Laila caused $117 million in damage and 65 people were Killed. It was the first cyclone to hit South India during pre-monsoon season in 20 years.
- Severe Cyclonic Storm Jal hit Tamil Nadu and made a direct hit over Chennai and brought considerable damage in the month of November.

==== 2011 ====
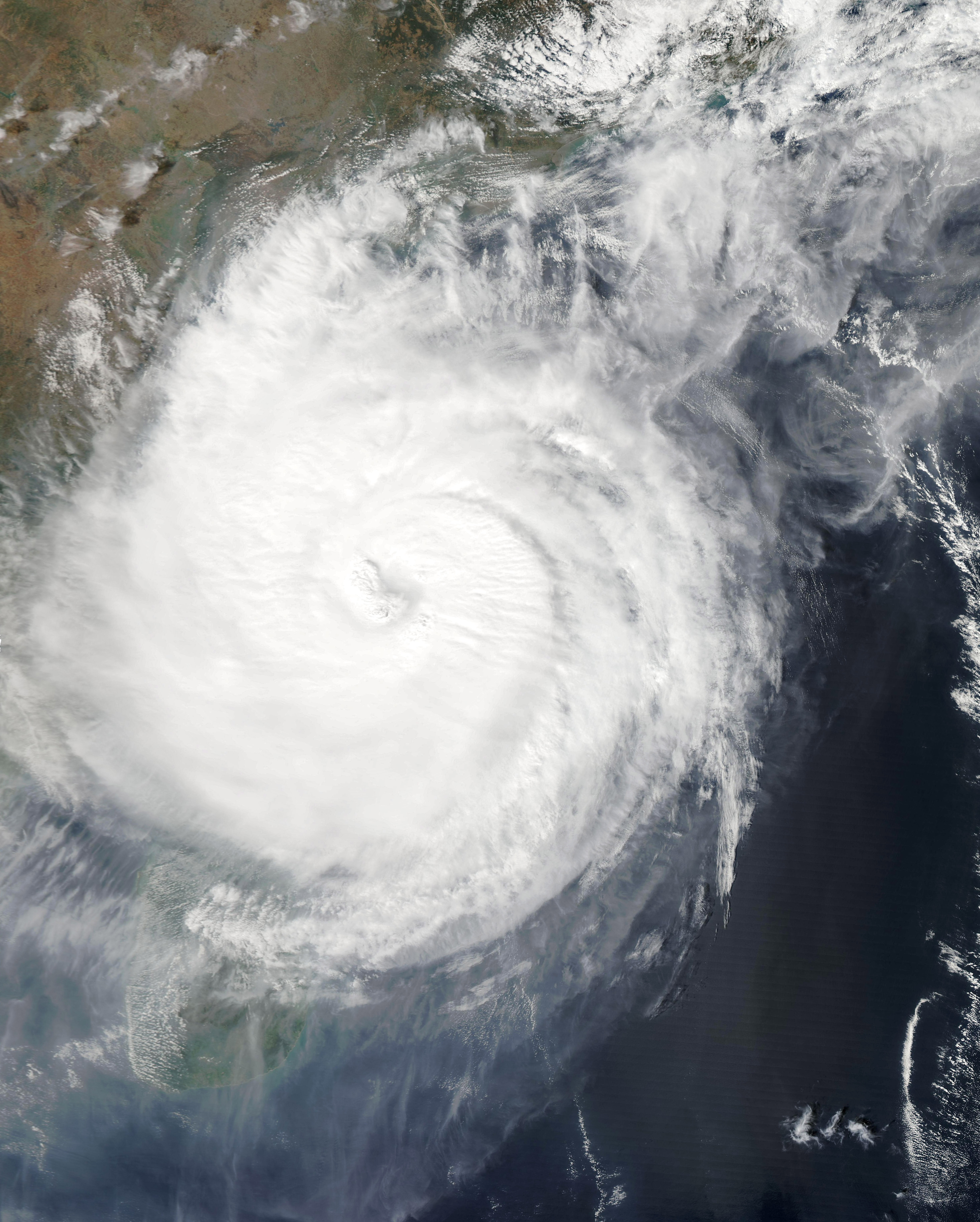
Cyclone Thane

This season was below average with two cyclones forming with one making landfall over India.

- Depression ARB 01 affected Gujarat and Maharashtra but no deaths and Damage were reported.
- Very Severe Cyclonic Storm Thane made landfall over Cuddalore in Tamilnadu on 30 December which marks the latest date for a cyclone to make landfall anywhere in the Indian Ocean basin. It made catastrophic damage over, Puducherry and Tamilnadu.

==== 2012 ====
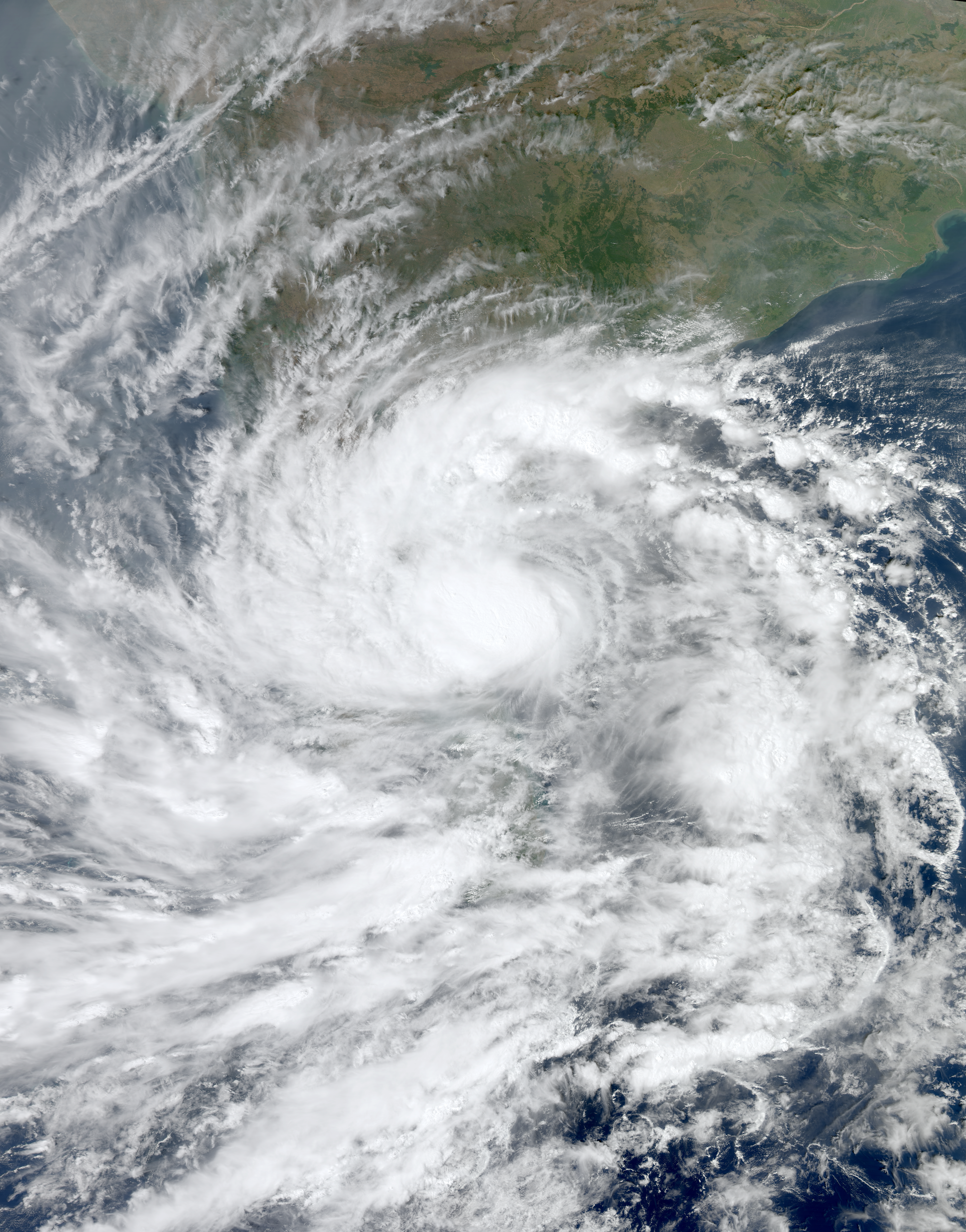
Cyclone Nilam

This season had the latest start in the North Indian Ocean basin on record by first system forming on 12 October. It was the least active season since 1993 as only five systems formed and two cyclones forming. One made landfall in India out of two cyclones.

- Cyclonic Storm Nilam was the deadly storm and the only cyclone to make landfall in India on that year, attacked Mamallapuram in Tamilnadu in October and brought worse damage to that state and Rayalaseema region of Andhra Pradesh. It killed 75 people in those places.

==== 2013 ====
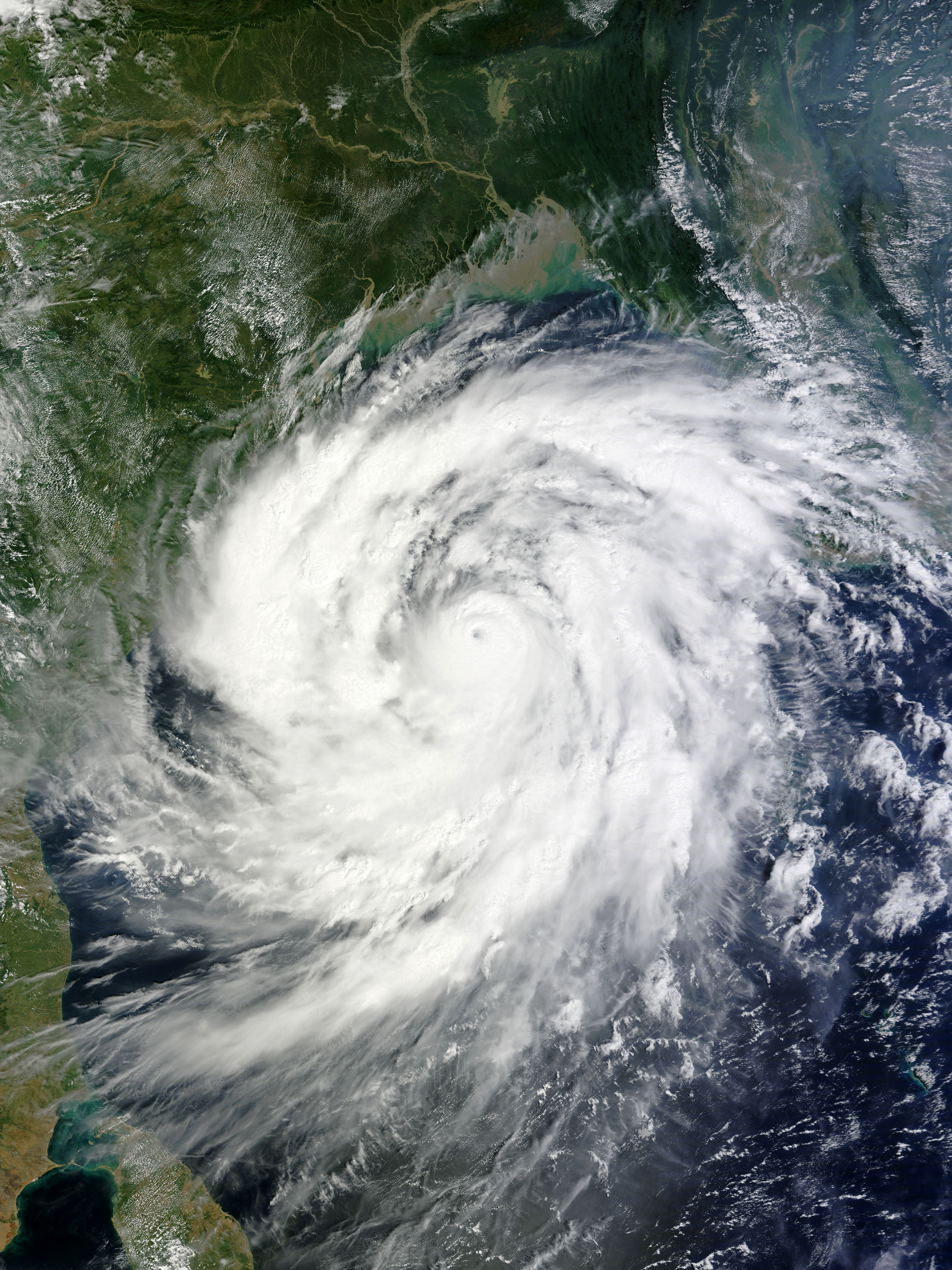
Cyclone Phailin

The season was above average with five cyclones forming and four making landfall over India.

- Cyclonic Storm Viyaru worsened the heatwave conditions over South India as it moved away from India and hit Bangladesh.
- Extremely Severe Cyclonic Storm Phailin was a Category 5 hurricane and made landfall over Gopalpur in Odisha which makes the most intense storm to make landfall at Odisha since 1999 Odisha Cyclone. More than a million people have been evacuated in preparedness for this cyclone.
- Severe Cyclonic Storm Helen and Very Severe Cyclonic Storm Lehar made back-to-back landfall over Machilipatnam in Andhra Pradesh in the month of November. But damage was minimal as both the cyclones weakened when it makes landfall. But Cyclone Helen killed 12 people in Andhra Pradesh.
- Very Severe Cyclonic Storm Madi tracked a rare path in the Bay of Bengal by moving northeast initially and making sharp turn towards southwest in the month of December. It brought beneficial rains to Tamilnadu and damage was minimal.

==== 2014 ====
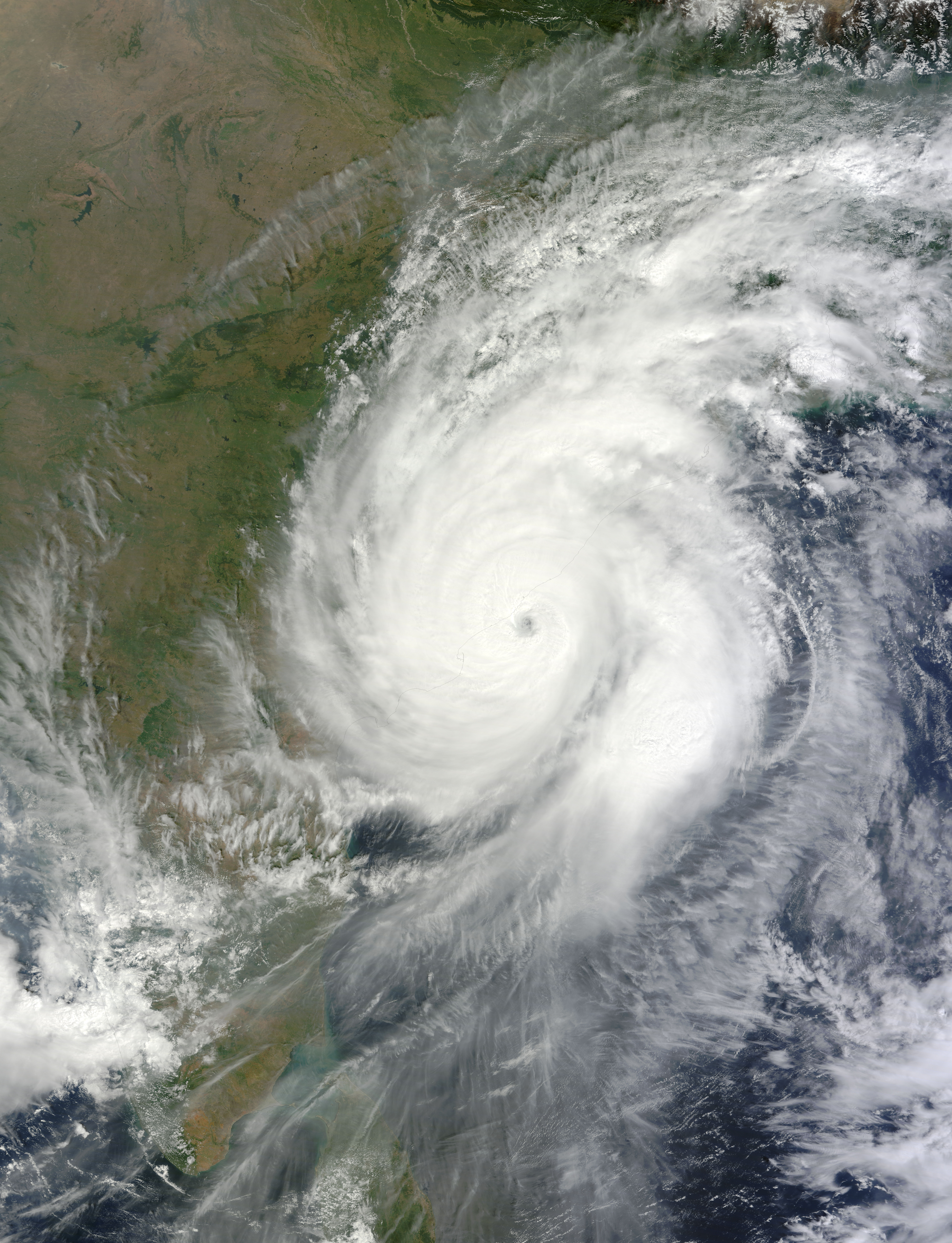
Cyclone Hudhud

The season was below average with only three cyclones forming with only one making landfall over India.

- Cyclonic Storm Nanauk formed over the Arabian Sea but delayed the onset of the Southwest Monsoon over Kerala.
- Extremely Severe Cyclonic Storm Hudhud made a catastrophic landfall in its peak intensity of category 4 hurricane over Visakhapatnam on 14 October and made worse damage to that place. Its remnants were traced back till the Western Himalayas which is very rare.

==== 2015 ====
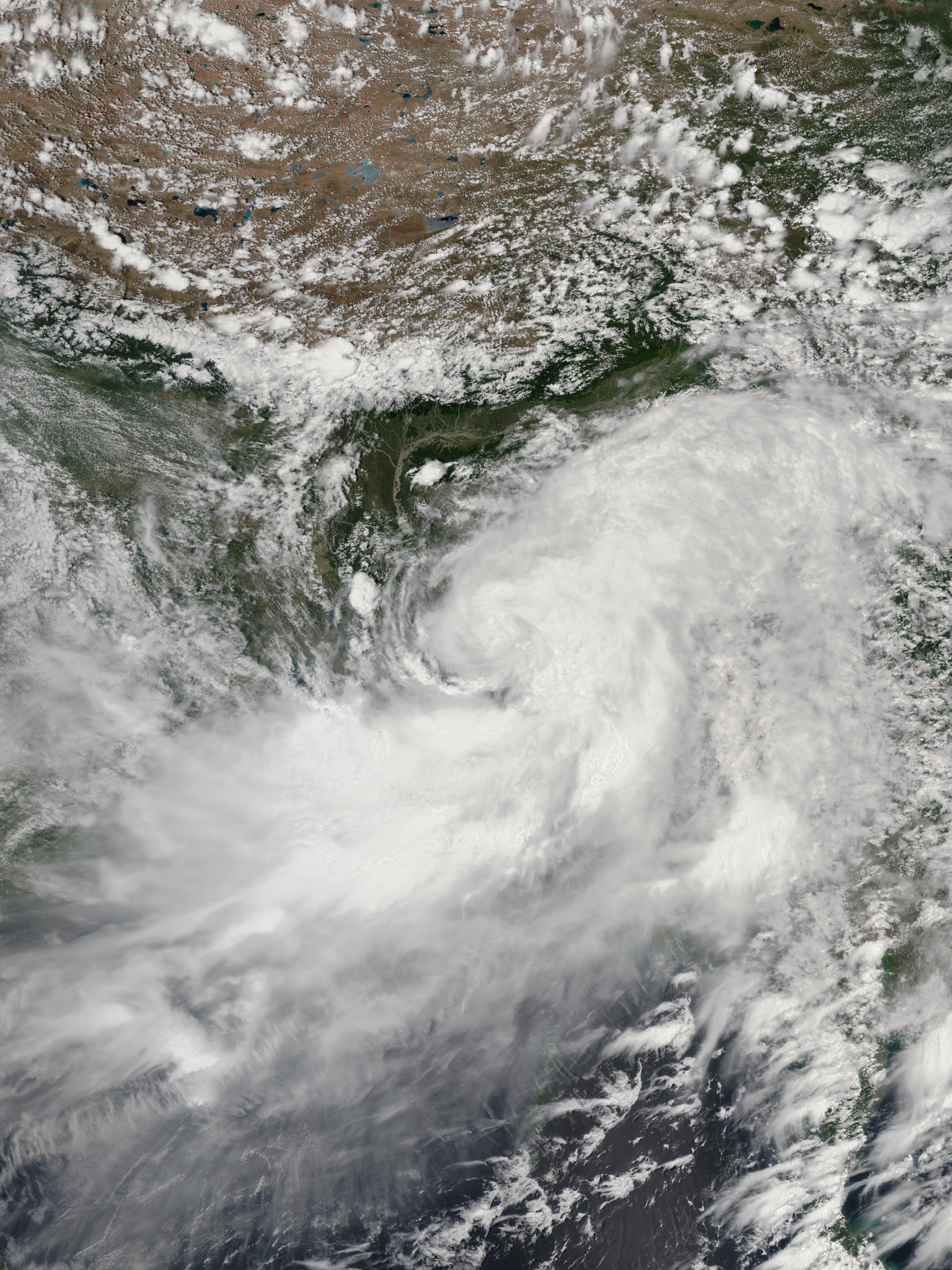
Cyclone Komen

The season despite being under powerful El Nino which was near normal with four cyclones forming, but the season haven't feature even a single Indian landfall. But depressions formed during monsoons were the deadliest.

- Deep Depression ARB 02 affected Gujarat, causing $260 million in damage and 81 deaths.
- Cyclonic Storm Komen after attacking Bangladesh entered into India and brought worst flooding over East India killing 285 people which makes it the deadliest cyclone worldwide in the year 2015.
- Deep Depression BOB 03 along with northeast monsoon seasonal low pressures in the months of November and December brought worst flooding over Tamilnadu and Chennai in 100 years. It killed nearly 500 people and unofficially makes one of the costliest disasters in India on record by damage, exceeding up to $15 billion.

==== 2016 ====
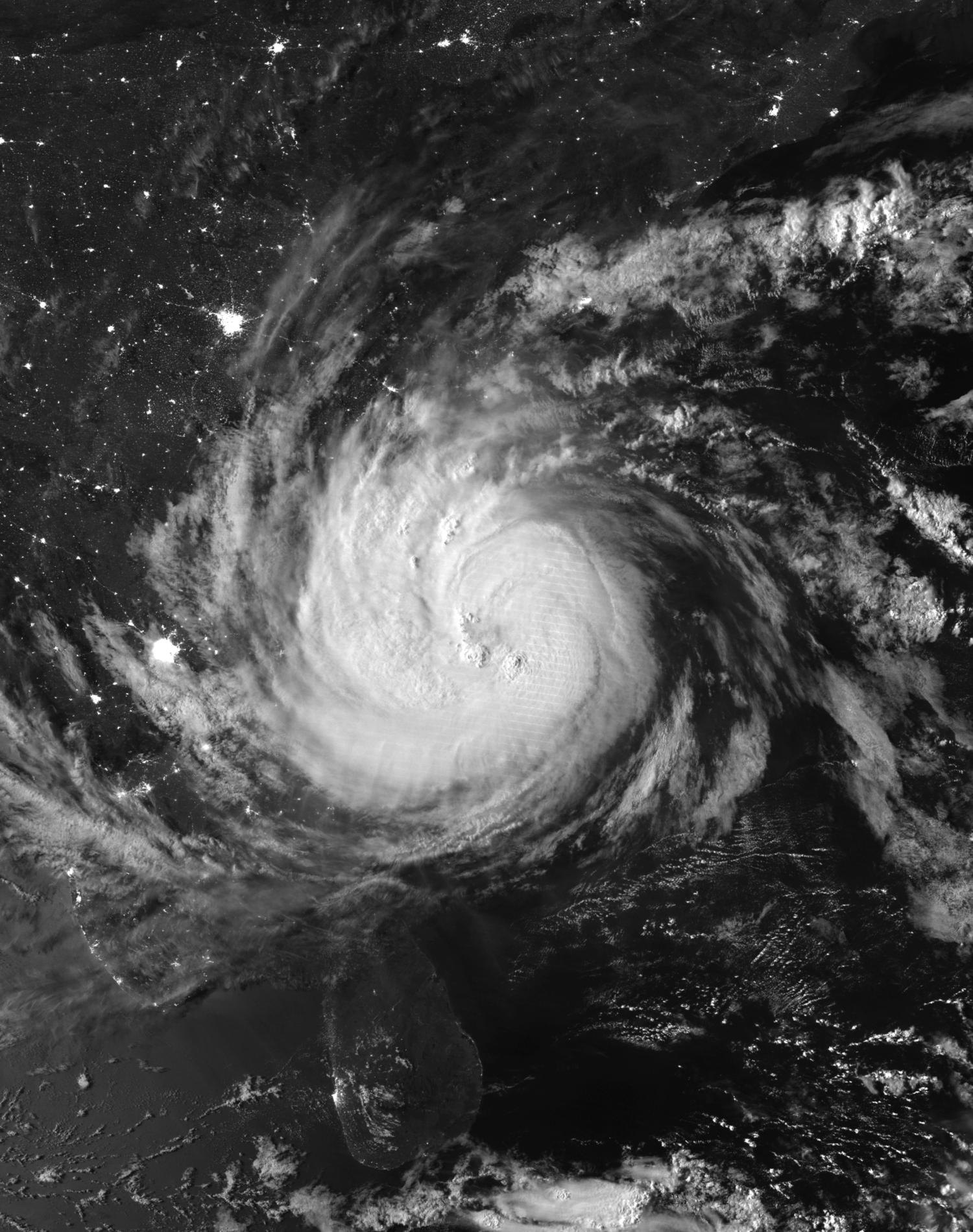
Cyclone Vardah

The season was near normal with four cyclones forming with three affecting India and one threatened the coast.

- Cyclonic Storm Roanu tracked a rare path in the month of May by skirting the whole East Coast of India and brought beneficial rains for Tamil Nadu, Andhra Pradesh and Odisha, which were suffering from the deadly heatwave associated with the El Nino .
- Very Severe Cyclonic Storm Vardah attacked Tamilnadu and making a direct hit over Chennai killing 12 people and damage of $4.3 billion.

==== 2017 ====
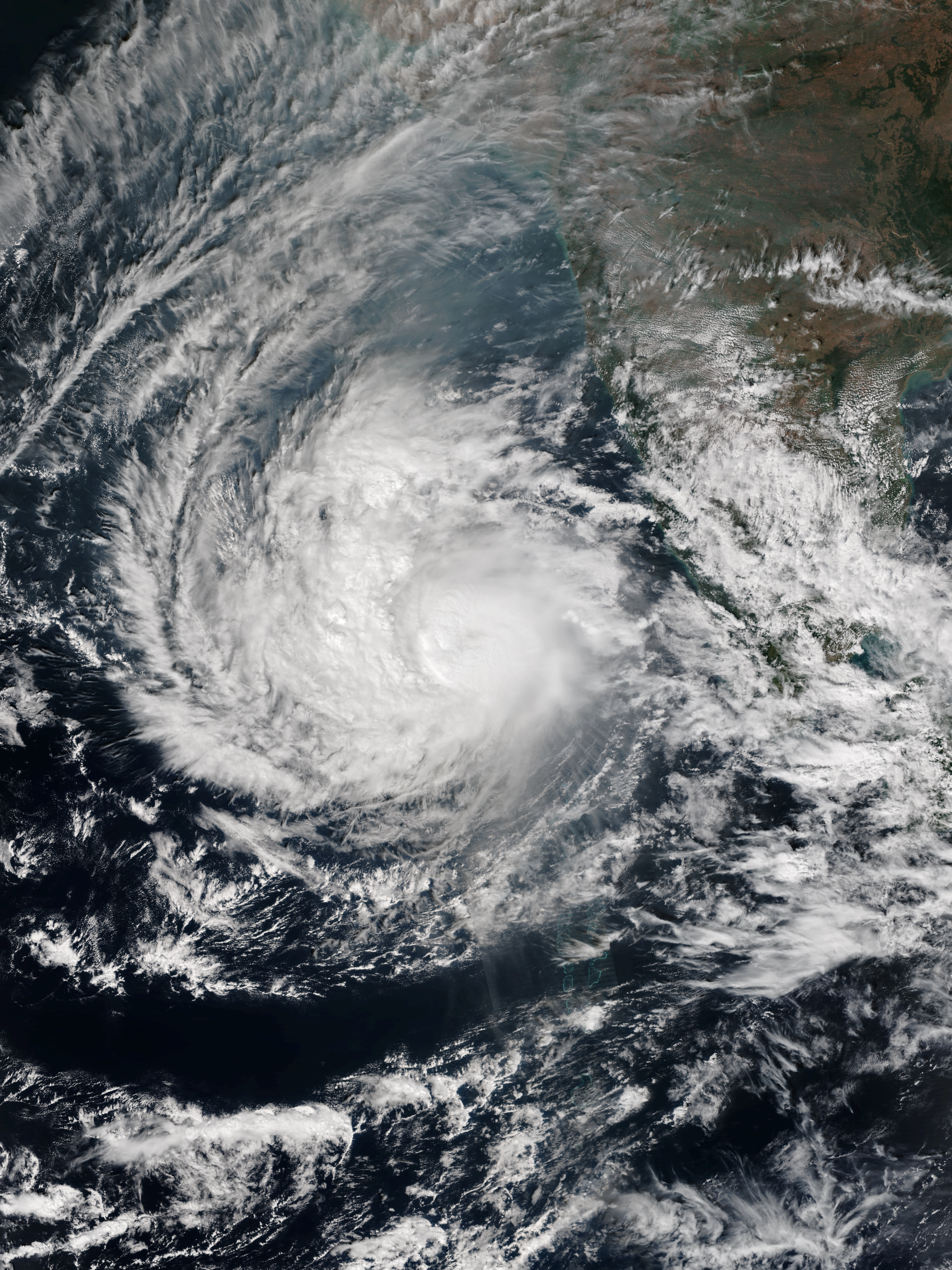
Cyclone Ockhi

The season was below average with three cyclones forming with one affecting India.

- Cyclonic Storm Maarutha worsened the conditions of the heatwave over South India as it moved away from the Indian landmass and attacked Myanmar. It was one of the only three cyclones to form in the first fifteen days in the month of April in the satellite era as formation of cyclones are very rare during that time.
- Severe Cyclonic Storm Mora after striking Bangladesh in the month of May brought deadly landslides over Northeast India which killed 20 people.
- Depression BOB 04 affected Odisha and caused 7 deaths and $34 million in damage.
- Land Depression 01 caused dangerous floods in West Bengal. At least 152 people died, while nearly 2 million people were affected in over 160 villages, which were inundated due to heavy rains.
- Land Depression 02 produced heavy rainfall in East India, and also caused 3 deaths in Odisha by lightning and heavy rainfall. The system caused 200 mm of rainfall in Durgapur. Halisahar recorded 105 mm with strong gusty wind of 65 km/h. Kolkata was badly affected by the dangerous weather receiving rain up to 124.4 mm (4.9 in).
- Depression BOB 05 caused the Odisha state government on 20 October to declare the heavy rains caused by the storm as a "State-Specific Disaster". Up to 25 blocks of eight districts in the state had received rainfall exceeding 135 mm (5 in), with the Kanas block of the Puri district recording rainfall of 274 mm (10 in). Heavy damage to homes were reported in Balasore and Bhadrak districts, with an infant reported to have died in the former district following the collapse of a wall.
- Very Severe Cyclonic Storm Ockhi lashed heavy rainfall across Southern tip of India as it neared up to 30 km from the coast, killing 318 and displaced many people. It followed a rare path from Bay of Bengal to the Arabian Sea and only one of the five cyclones to do so by attacking the Southern tip of India since reliable records began in 1851. Many fishermens were feared to get lost by this storm as they don't know properly about the cyclone's rare trajectory. It brought rare December rainfall over Maharashtra and Gujarat as a weakening low pressure area combined with a western disturbance.

==== 2018 ====
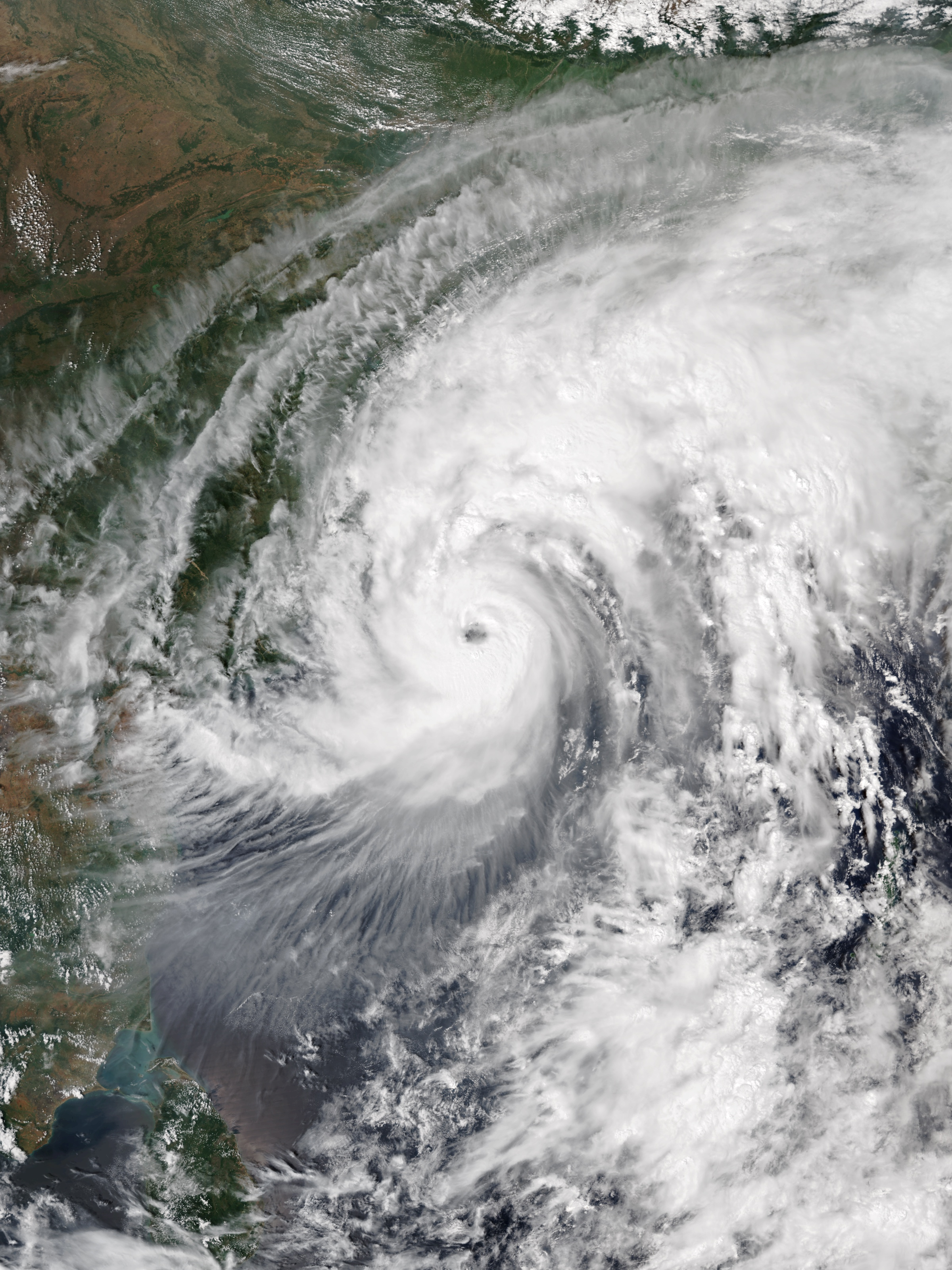
Cyclone Titli

The season was first in the series of three consecutive years of above average activity. Total seven cyclones formed with four attacking India which is the highest number since 1992. The season was first time since 1977 to have simultaneous cyclones in either sides of the North Indian Ocean (Bay of Bengal and Arabian Sea) at a same time.

- Deep Depression BOB 03 caused heavy rainfall in western Uttar Pradesh and the Indian capital of New Delhi. Rainfall peaked at Meerut in Uttar Pradesh which received 226 mm of rain in 24 hours. The river Yamuna crossed the danger level and reached to 205.5 meters by 29 July, prompting the evacuation of more than 1,500 people in Delhi.
- Depression BOB 04, Depression BOB 05 and Deep Depression BOB 06 were short lived storms which affected eastern India during the months of August and September.
- Cyclonic Storm Daye impacted south Odisha early on 21 September, near Gopalpur. Daye continued moving westward, while dropping heavy amounts of rain across India. It was the first September cyclone in the Bay of Bengal since Cyclone Pyarr in the year 2005. Minimal damage was reported.
- Very Severe Cyclonic Storm Titli made landfall near Palasa, Andhra Pradesh, at peak intensity of 150 km/h. Titli killed at least 77 people in Odisha and left a couple of others missing, due to heavy flooding and landslides. It caused major destruction to East Coast railway.
- Very Severe Cyclonic Storm Gaja made landfall in southern India, on 16 November. The storm survived crossing over into the Arabian Sea later that day; however, it degenerated into a remnant low in hostile conditions only several days later, on 20 November. 52 people were killed.
- Severe Cyclonic Storm Phethai developed in the southern Bay of Bengal on 13 December. It steadily strengthened and on 16 December, and made landfall at Katrenikona on 17 December, with 3-minute sustained winds of 50 mph. 8 people were reported dead.

==== 2019 ====
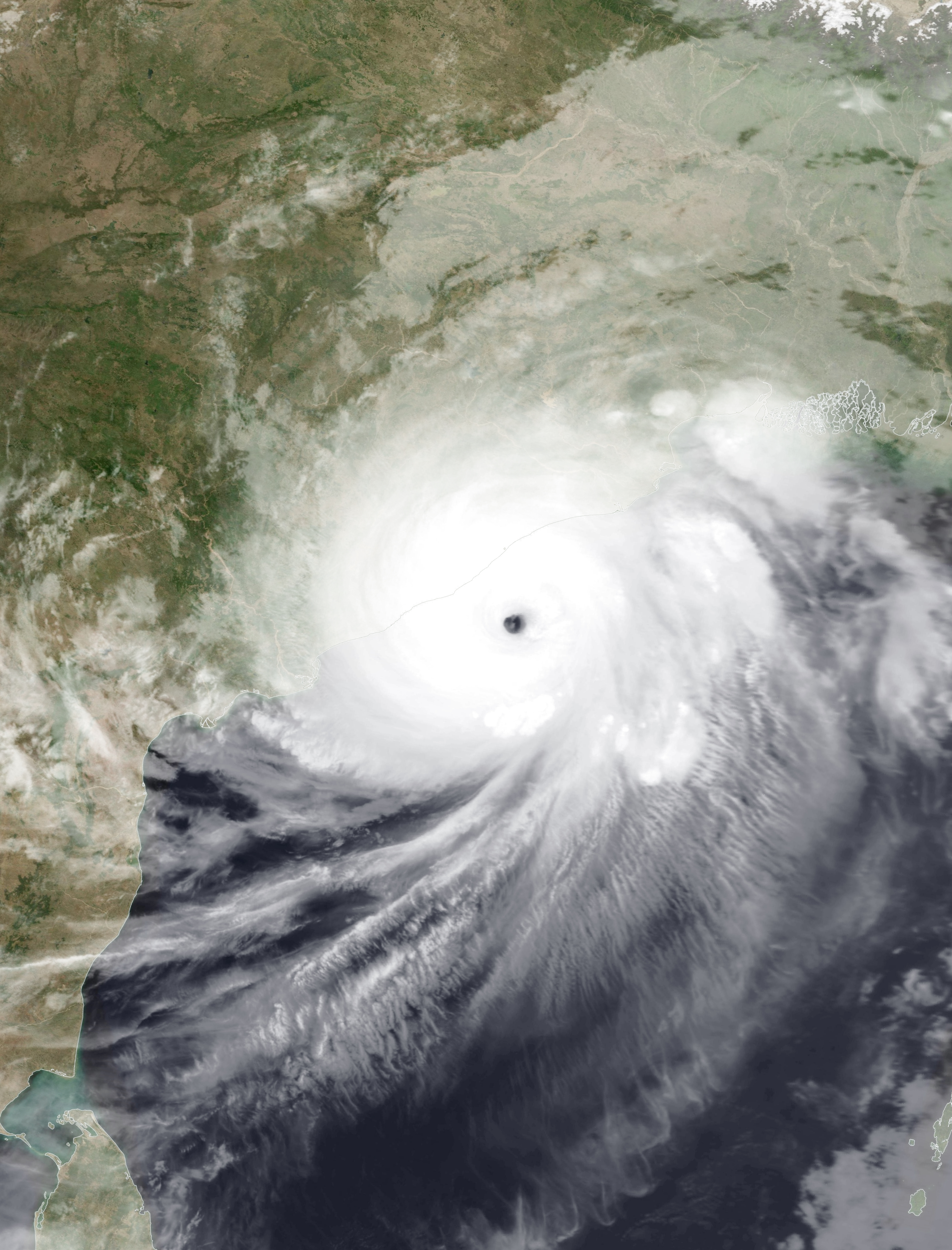
Cyclone Fani

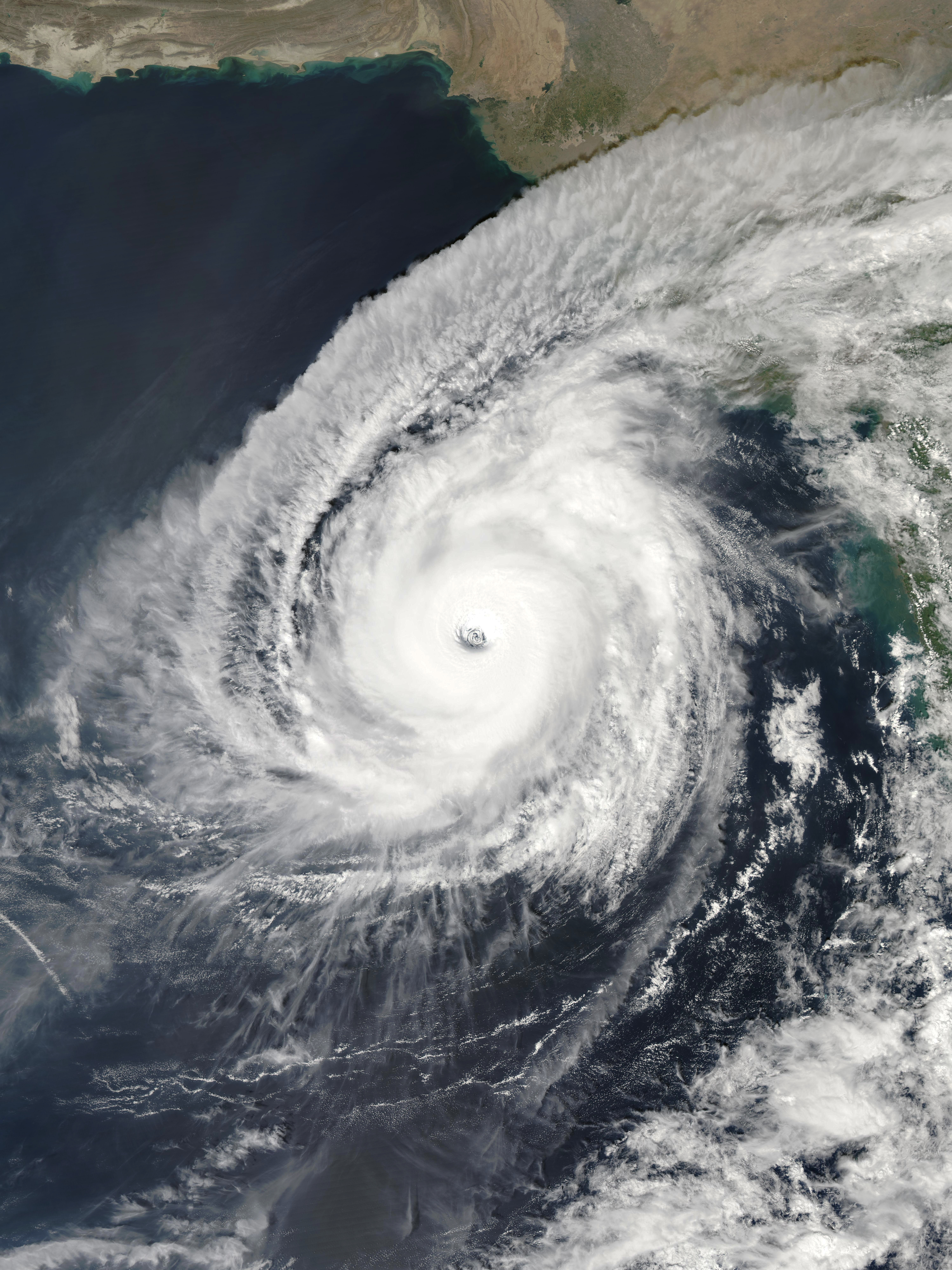
Cyclone Kyarr

- Extremely Severe Cyclonic Storm Fani made landfall at Puri on 3 May as a Category 5 equivalent tropical cyclone with official wind speed of 215 km/h (135 mph), however JTWC estimated that it was 280 km/h (175 mph) unofficially beating the record of Gonu in terms of 1 minute sustained wind speed and it is unofficially the strongest cyclone ever recorded in the North Indian Ocean based on the windspeed. It also became the strongest tropical cyclone to make landfall in the state of Odisha after 1999 Odisha Cyclone and Phailin. Damage cost was US$8.1 billion.
- The remnants of Very Severe Cyclonic Storm Vayu impacted Gujarat causing some damage. 8 deaths were reported. Initially the storm skirted the Saurashtra coast of Gujarat as a minimal category 3 major tropical cyclone.
- Deep Depression BOB 03, around 08:00–09:00 UTC, made landfall along the north Odisha-West Bengal coastline on 7 August. Heavy rainfall was recorded in many parts of Odisha, peaking at 382.6 mm (15.06 in) in Lanjigarh. 3 deaths were reported
- Very Severe Cyclonic Storm Hikaa sunk a boat which carried 11 Indian fishermen. As of 17 October, six of them were confirmed dead, and the other five remained missing.
- Land Depression 01 formed on 30 September and caused minimal damage.
- The outer bands of Super Cyclonic Storm Kyarr on skirting Maharashtra coast caused heavy rainfall in some portions of Western India. It also caused an increase in vector borne diseases in some areas.
- Extremely Severe Cyclonic Storm Maha caused minor damage in western and southern India. It then made landfall near Gujarat as a depression and quickly weakened afterwards.
- Very Severe Cyclonic Storm Bulbul formed on 6 November from the remnants of Severe Tropical Storm Matmo which traversed into the Bay of Bengal. Bulbul then underwent a rapid intensification, becoming a very severe cyclonic storm on 8 November and made landfall at West Bengal. It produced heavy rain over many parts of West Bengal
- Deep Depression ARB 06 on its initial stages brought heavy rainfall over South India and killed 25 people.

=== 2020s ===
==== 2020 ====
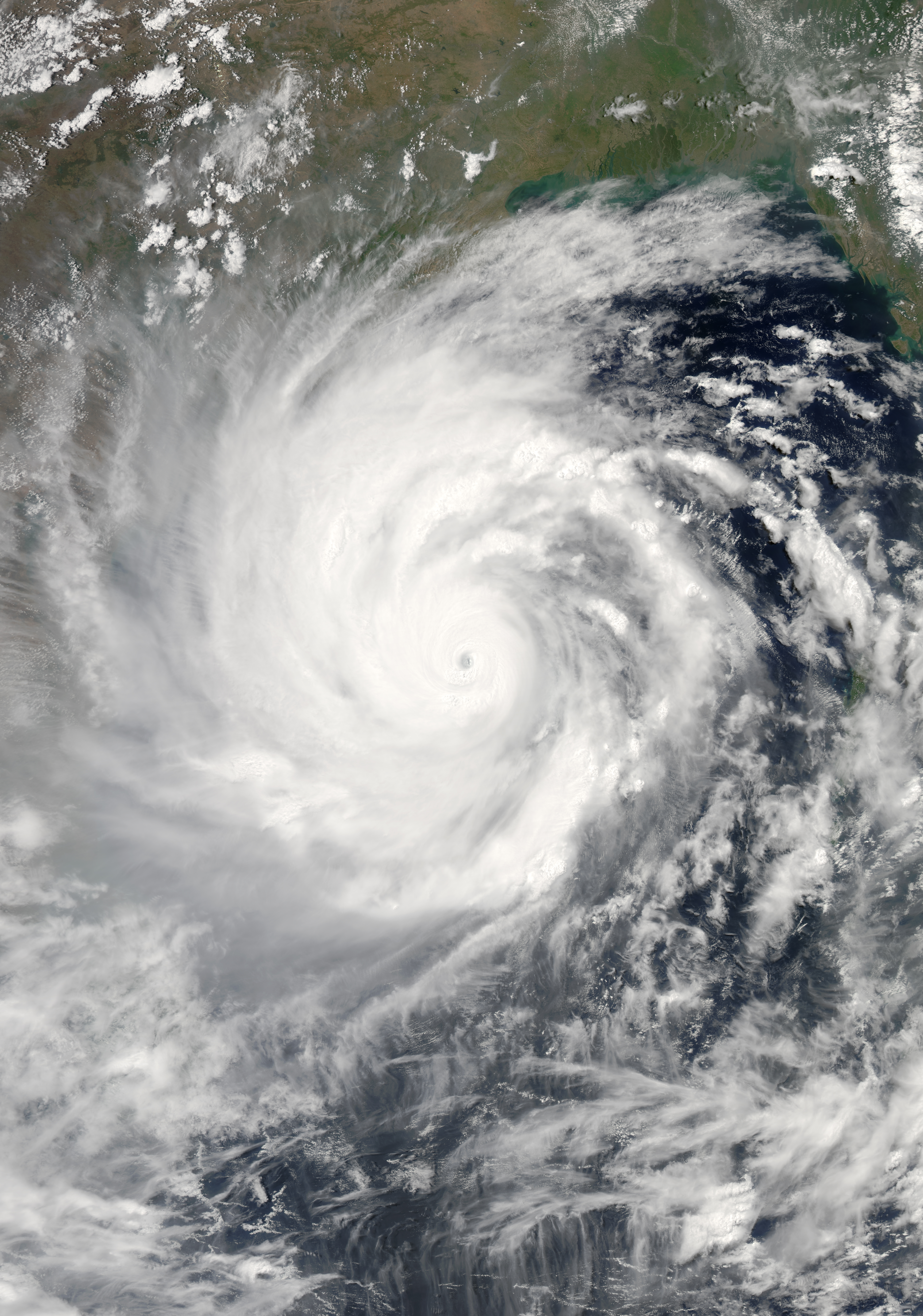
Cyclone Amphan

The season was third consecutive year of above average activity as five cyclones formed this year with three making landfall over India. The season was the second in a row to have a Super Cyclonic Storm and the first to record in Bay of Bengal since 1999.

- Super Cyclonic Storm Amphan explosively intensified from a Category 1-equivalent cyclone to a Category 4-equivalent cyclone in just 6 hours and further into category 5-equivalent cyclone and Super Cyclonic Storm. It made landfall on 20 May near Bakkhali, West Bengal after weakening subsequently. It left behind a trail of catastrophic damage, and was later confirmed to be the costliest storm ever recorded in the basin. 128 deaths were recorded.
- Severe Cyclonic Storm Nisarga made landfall near the coastal town of Alibag in Maharashtra at 12:30 IST on 3 June. About 400mm of rain was recorded at Kavaratti. It was the first cyclone to make landfall at Maharashtra since Cyclone Phyan in the year 2009.
- Deep Depression BOB 02 developed over the west-central Bay of Bengal, though the system was originally observed near the Spratly Islands over the South China Sea on 6 October and made landfall in Andhra Pradesh near Kakinada early on 13 October. The torrential rains caused flash flooding in Hyderabad killing at least 80 people.
- Very Severe Cyclonic Storm Nivar made landfall between Karaikal and Mamallapuram around Puducherry on 25 November. 14 deaths and $600 million damage were reported. It brought considerable damage to Andhra Pradesh too.
- Cyclonic Storm Burevi dropped heavy rainfall across south India. It brought heavy rainfall over Tamil Nadu and those places which were already affected by Cyclone Nivar. The storm killed 9 people.

==== 2021 ====
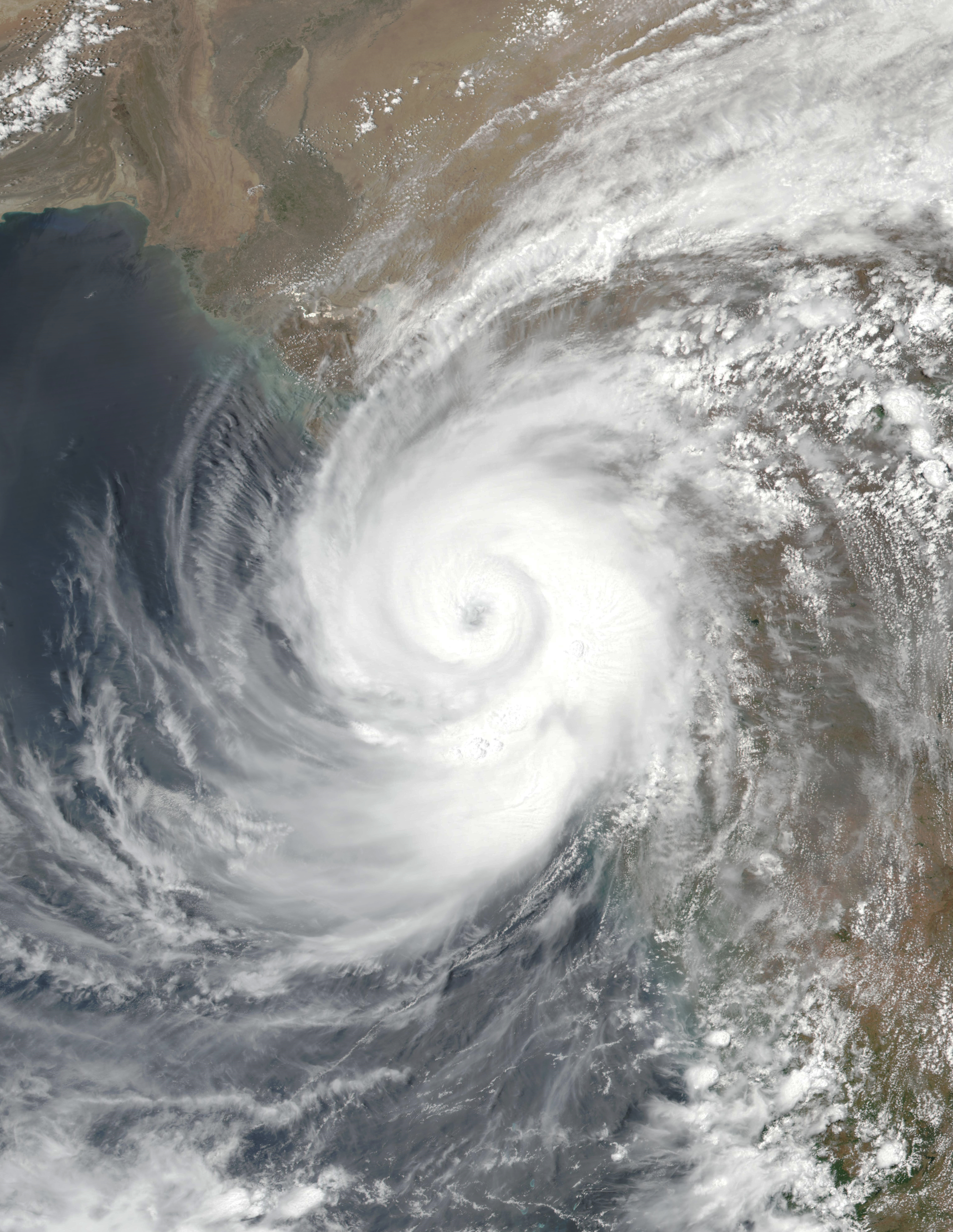
Cyclone Tauktae

This season was fourth consecutive year of above average activity with five cyclones forming and three making landfall over India and one threatened the coast.

- Depression BOB 01 caused light to moderate rainfall with minimal damage in the Andaman and Nicobar Islands as a rare early April system.
- Extremely Severe Cyclonic Storm Tauktae caused heavy rainfall and high gust winds in South India, Gujarat, Goa and Maharashtra. It made landfall on the southern coast of Saurashtra peninusula in Gujarat and caused moderate to heavy damage in the southern peninsular coastal areas of Gujarat. It was the worst storm to hit Gujarat in 20 years since 1998 Gujarat cyclone.
- Very Severe Cyclonic Storm Yaas made landfall over the state of Odisha becoming the second cyclone to hit the nation within a span of ten days. The most affected states are West Bengal and Odisha. At least 10 million people were affected and 300,000 houses were damaged. Most them were caused by storm surge, high astronomical tides and broken embankments. The cyclone also affected Nepal and Bangladesh.
- Deep Depression BOB 03 affected Odisha, killing three. 2 people died after separate house collapses and another person reportedly drowned in a drain.
- Cyclone Gulab hit Andhra Pradesh close to Kalingapatnam on 26 September becoming the first cyclone to form in Bay of Bengal for the month of September since Cyclone Daye of 2018. Twenty people were killed due to the storm in various places of Central India. Its remnants affected Maharashtra and Gujarat, later on becoming Cyclone Shaheen by reaching the Arabian Sea on 30 September.
- Depression BOB 05 and Depression BOB 06 made back-to-back landfall over the state of Tamilnadu gave extremely heavy rainfall over the state along with Puducherry and Andhra Pradesh while the latter one had caused historic flooding after 20 years over Rayalaseema and additional rainfall over there. Overall deaths from both the systems were estimated to be near hundred.
- Cyclone Jawad skirted and threatened the coasts of Andhra Pradesh, Odisha and West Bengal before weakening into a low pressure area and making landfall over the Sunderbans. Two deaths were reported due to the cyclone.

==== 2022 ====
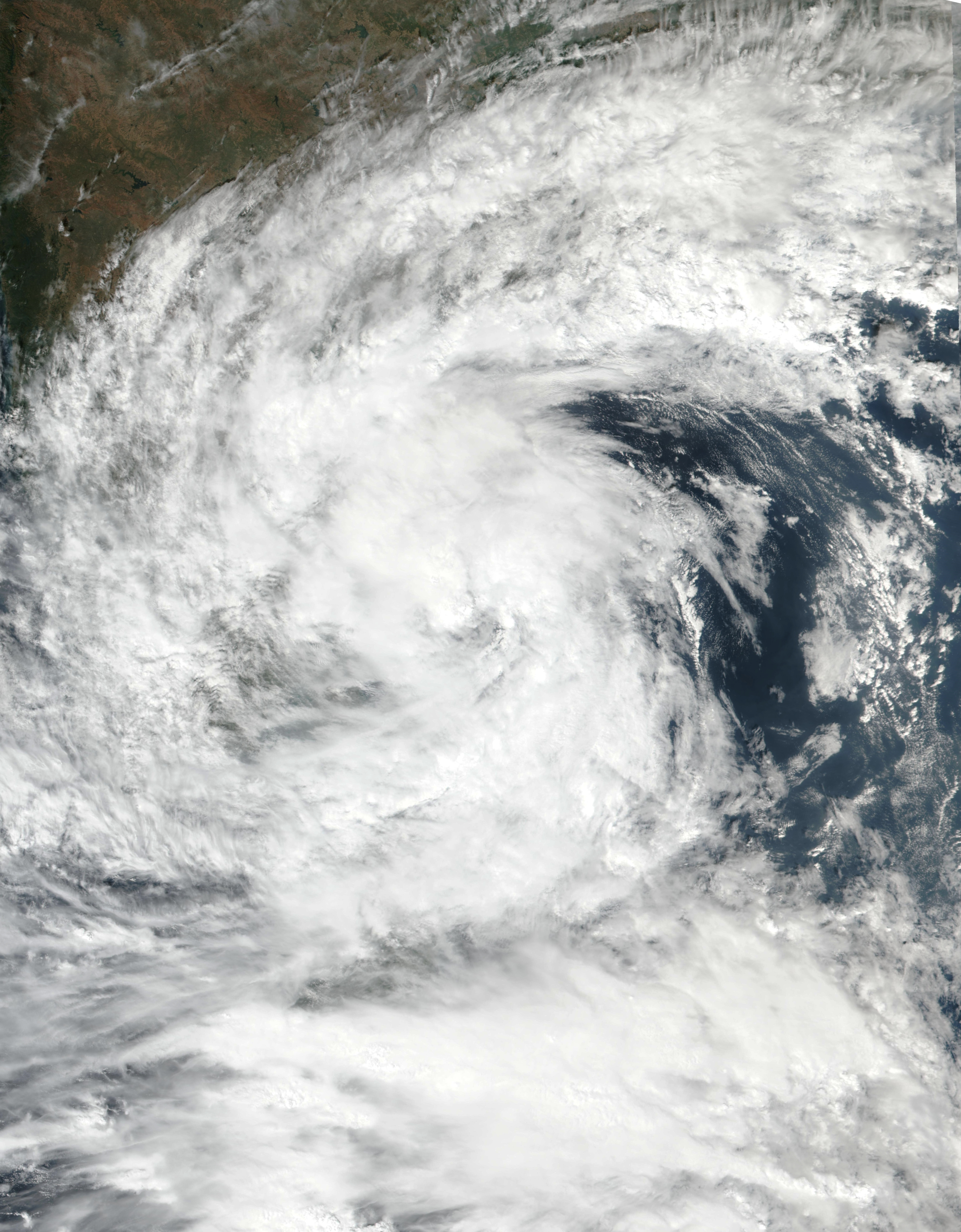
Cyclone Mandous

This season ended the streak of four consecutive years with above average cyclone activity by having only three cyclones forming this year and two making landfall over India.

- Cyclone Asani became a rare cyclone after making landfall near Machilipatnam in May. It was the first cyclone to do so in pre-monsoon since Cyclone Laila of 2010. Rainfall from the storm helped relieve people while a local heatwave was occurring. Three deaths were reported and crop damage amounted to US$1.57 million (121 million rupee).
- Deep Depression BOB 06 made landfall in the state of West Bengal in August as a monsoon depression. Large amounts of rainfall were reported in East and North India and the remnants later contributed to the 2022 Pakistan floods.
- Cyclone Mandous made landfall near Mamallapuram on 9 December with winds of 65 km/h. Five deaths were reported in Tamil Nadu, while damage in Tirupati district was US$27.4 million (2.26 billion rupee). Its remnants later entered into the Arabian Sea and regenerated into Deep Depression ARB 03.

==== 2023 ====
- Cyclone Biparjoy made landfall near Port of Jakhau on 15 June with winds of 120 km/h. 12 people were found dead after the cyclone, while damage in Gujarat reached US$148 million (12.13 billion rupee).
- Cyclone Michaung made landfall just south of Bapatla on 5 December with winds of 95 km/h. The cyclone killed 17 people and resulted in a loss of US$1.32 billion (110 billion rupee).

==== 2024 ====
- In August 2024, a land depression which later became Cyclone Asna triggered flooding in Gujarat and killed 49 people. Damage statewide was calculated to be US$30 million (2.5 billion rupee).
- Cyclone Dana made landfall near Bhitarkanika National Park on 25 October (local time) with winds of 100 km/h. The cyclone killed 5 across India, and incurred a loss of US$73.3 million (6.16 billion rupee).
- Cyclone Fengal made landfall between Karaikal and Mamallapuram on 30 November. Fengal caused flooding and landslides in South India which killed 20 people. Authorities estimated the damage to be US$17.7 million (1.5 billion rupee).

== Climatology ==
Cyclones Affecting India by month
Month	Number of Cyclones
January	2
February	0
March	1
April	3
May	19
June	30
July	19
August	24
September	21
October	41
November	34
December	17

Cyclones affecting India by period
Period	Number of Cyclones
2020s	7

== Records ==
- The most intense tropical cyclone to make landfall was the 1999 Odisha Cyclone which hit the state of Odisha. Its minimum pressure was 912 mbar (26.93 inHg) and maximum wind speed was 260 km/h (160 mph).
- The costliest tropical cyclone was Cyclone Amphan of 2020 which hit the state of Odisha and West Bengal. The damage cost was US$13 billion beating the record of Cyclone Nargis.
- The deadliest is the 1839 India cyclone which hit the present day state of Andhra Pradesh. It caused over 300,000 fatalities and 20,000 ship destroyed.
- The wettest tropical cyclone was the 1968 Severe Cyclonic Storm which hit the state of West Bengal with record breaking rainfall of 2,300 mm (90.55 in).

== See also ==
- North Indian Ocean cyclone season
- Tropical cyclones in Bangladesh
- Tropical cyclones in Myanmar
- Tropical cyclones in Sri Lanka
