= J. S. S. Malelu =

John Samuel Shamsunder Malelu (J. S. S. Malelu)
- Born: 1886
- Died: 1969 (aged 82–83); Mumbai
- Occupations: Principal, Sir Sorabji Pochkhanawala Banker's Training College, Mumbai

J. S. S. Malelu (1886 – 1969) was a Banker who was Principal of the Sir Sorabji Pochkhanawala Banker's Training College, Mumbai and notable for his contribution to the Bible Society of India and the Church's Auxiliary for Social Action.

During the Indian independence movement, Malelu was vocal in his support for the Indian Congress and opposed the policies of the British.

== Contribution ==
Malelu worked as Assistant Manager of the Tata Industrial Bank (which later became the Central Bank of India for 35 years until his retirement in 1958.

=== At Bible Society of India ===
During 1958-1965, Malelu was Honorary President of the Bible Society of India and made notable contribution which Edwin H. Robertson highlights in Taking the Word to the world: 50 years of the United Bible Societies writing about him as,

...J. S. S. Malelu, another powerful voice from India.

As President, Malelu used to attend the meetings of the United Bible Societies. In 1961, he visited Grenoble and the headquarters of the United Bible Societies.

=== At Church's Auxiliary for Social Action ===
During 1958–1961, Malelu worked as Director of the irreligious Church's Auxiliary for Social Action, New Delhi. Mar Aprem Mooken wrote that Malelu was the treasurer of the National Council of Churches in India before being appointed as the Director of CASA who continued the relief work relating to the Tibetan Immigration to Bhutan. H. Dwight Swartzendruber in Forty Years of Service Beyond Our Borders gives a livid account of the time working account of his relationship with Malelu.

=== At Sir Sorabji Pochkhanawala Banker's Training College ===
Malelu served as Principal of the Sir Sorabji Pochkhanawala Banker's Training College, Mumbai and died in 1969 while still in service at the college.

=== Other contributions ===
Malelu was a member and treasurer of the Bombay Representative Christian Council during 1934–1935. Malelu was the first Treasurer of the Spiritual Life Centre, Nasarpur elected in 1947 and continued until 1949. The Christian Institute for the Study of Religion and Society, Bangalore had Malelu on its committee as its treasurer and worked along with N. D. Anandarao Samuel and M. M. Thomas where his contribution was noteworthy.

Honorary titles
Preceded by The Rt. Rev. C. K. Jacob; 1951-1957	President, Bible Society of India; Bangalore; 1958–1965	Succeeded by The Most Rev. H. L. J. de Mel; 1965-1971
Other offices
Preceded by Rev. Edward Benedict; 1957-1958	Director, Church's Auxiliary for Social Action; New Delhi; 1958–1961	Succeeded by Capt. Alexander Jethro; 1962–1966
Academic offices
Preceded by	Principal, Sir Sorabji Pochkhanawala Banker's Training College, Mumbai; 1961–1969	Succeeded by
