= 1999 East India cyclone =

1999 tropical cyclone that struck India

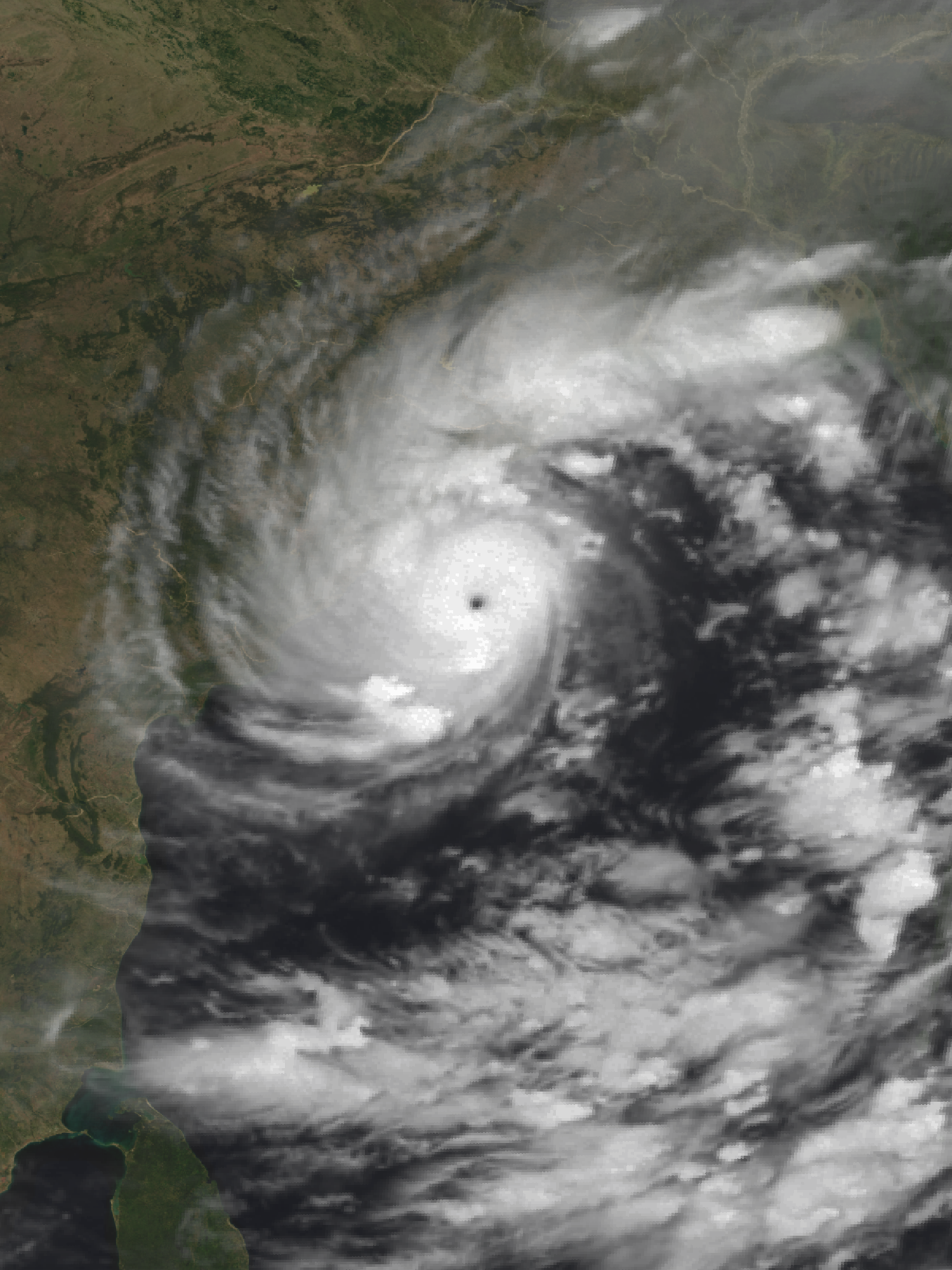
- 04B at peak intensity approaching Odisha.

Meteorological history
- Formed: 15 October 1999
- Dissipated: 19 October 1999

Extremely severe cyclonic storm
- 3-minute sustained (IMD)
- Highest winds: 215 km/h (130 mph)
- Highest gusts: 270 km/h (165 mph)
- Lowest pressure: 968 hPa (mbar); 28.59 inHg

Category 4-equivalent tropical cyclone
- 1-minute sustained (SSHWS/JTWC)
- Highest winds: 220 km/h (140 mph)

Overall effects
- Fatalities: 198
- Damage: $1 billion (1999 USD)
- Areas affected: India (particularly Odisha)
- Part of the 1999 North Indian Ocean cyclone season

The 1999 East India Cyclone (IMD designated BOB 05, JTWC designated 04B), was the second strongest, deadliest, and costliest cyclone of the 1999 North Indian Ocean cyclone season. On 15 October, a developing area of low pressure, located 220 nm northwest of the Andaman Islands began to intensify. By 1730Z a TCFA was issued and the first advisory on Tropical Storm 04B was issued at 2100Z. 04B was moving to the west-northwest at 8–12 knots as it continued to intensify. On 17 October, the storm began to turn to a more northerly direction as it intensified to a cyclone. 04B underwent explosive intensification the same day and reached its peak of 140 mph at 0000Z. The storm held this intensity as it made landfall on the Odisha coastline near Gopalpur beach at around 8am. The storm began to weaken due to the interaction with land and dissipated on 19 October. 04B was responsible for at least 180 fatalities and hundreds of houses and huts in low-lying areas were destroyed by flooding. Several thousand others were injured by the storm and hundreds were left homeless. The Prime Minister of India requested that relief supplies be distributed to the affected region immediately.

== Meteorological history ==
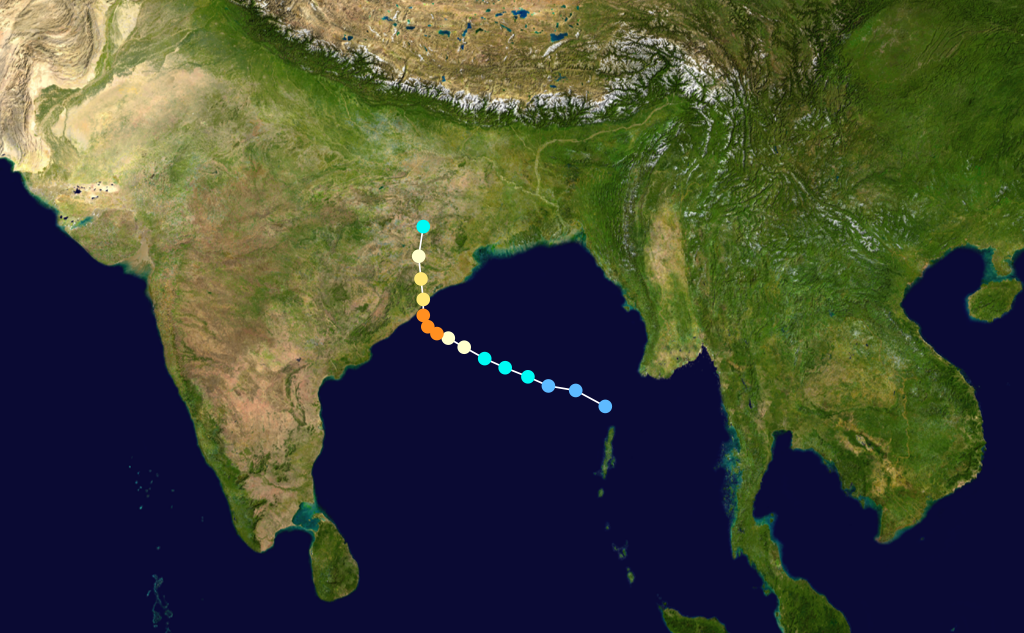
Map plotting the storm's track and intensity, according to the Saffir–Simpson scale Map key Saffir–Simpson scale Tropical depression (≤38 mph, ≤62 km/h) Tropical storm (39–73 mph, 63–118 km/h) Category 1 (74–95 mph, 119–153 km/h) Category 2 (96–110 mph, 154–177 km/h) Category 3 (111–129 mph, 178–208 km/h) Category 4 (130–156 mph, 209–251 km/h) Category 5 (≥157 mph, ≥252 km/h) Unknown Storm type Tropical cyclone Subtropical cyclone Extratropical cyclone, remnant low, tropical disturbance, or monsoon depression

On 15 October, a developing area of low pressure, located 220 nm northwest of the Andaman Islands began to intensify. By 1730Z a TCFA was issued and the first advisory on Tropical Storm 04B was issued at 2100Z. 04B was moving to the west-northwest at 8–12 knots as it continued to intensify. On 17 October, the storm began to turn to a more northerly direction as it intensified to a cyclone. 04B underwent explosive intensification the same day and reached its peak of 140 mph at 0000Z. The storm held this intensity as it made landfall on the Odisha coastline near Gopalpur beach. The storm began to weaken due to the interaction with land and dissipated on 19 October.

== Impact ==
At least 200 trains were canceled across India. The storm hit in the middle of India's six-week general election, with rain forecast in Kolkata forcing political parties to cancel campaign events.

=== Odisha ===
In Odisha, 197 people lost their lives, and 402 people were injured. Thousands of hectares of crops were lost. The State of Odisha has put a lot of effort into creating a disaster risk management structure after 1999.

=== Andhra Pradesh ===
In Andhra Pradesh, one person lost his life, and millions of trees were uprooted.

== See also ==
- 1999 Odisha Cyclone - The next storm in the season that devastated similar areas.
