= 1999 Odisha cyclone =

North Indian Ocean cyclone

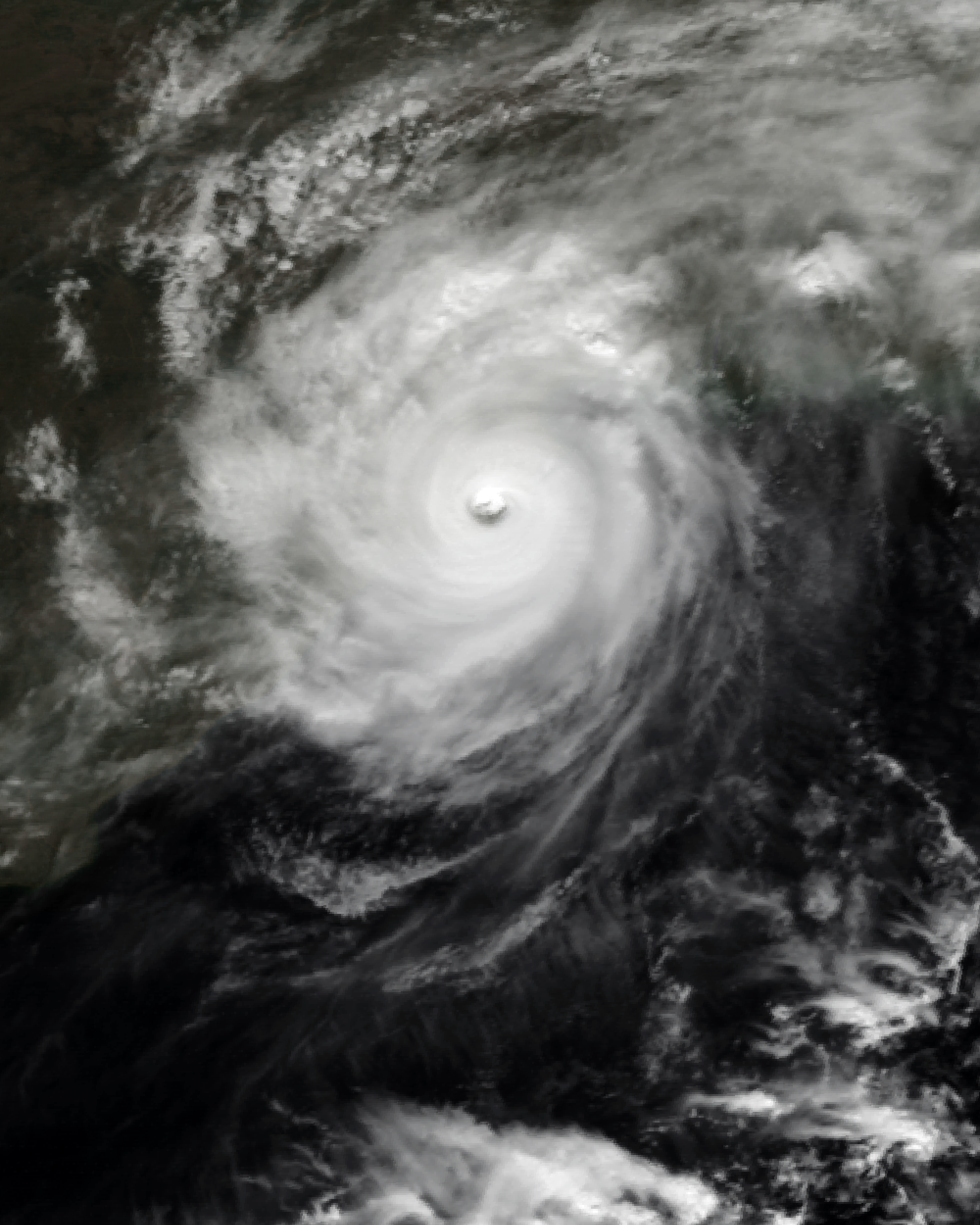
- The cyclone on 29 October at its record peak intensity as it made landfall on Odisha

Meteorological history
- Formed: 25 October 1999
- Remnant low: 31 October 1999
- Dissipated: 4 November 1999

Super cyclonic storm
- 3-minute sustained (IMD)
- Highest winds: 260 km/h (160 mph)
- Lowest pressure: 912 hPa (mbar); 26.93 inHg (Record low in North Indian Ocean)

Category 5-equivalent tropical cyclone
- 1-minute sustained (SSHWS/JTWC)
- Highest winds: 260 km/h (160 mph)

Overall effects
- Fatalities: 9,887 (India) (Using IMD figure. Some estimates range up to 30,000)
- Damage: $4.44 billion (2000 USD)
- Areas affected: India (particularly Odisha), Myanmar, Bangladesh
- IBTrACS
- Part of the 1999 North Indian Ocean cyclone season

The 1999 Odisha cyclone (IMD designation BOB 06, JTWC designation 05B) was the most intense tropical cyclone ever recorded in the North Indian Ocean and among the most destructive in the region. (Note: In 1999, Odisha was known as Orissa; its name was changed in 2011 following the passage of the Orissa Bill and adoption of the 113th Amendment to the Constitution of India through Parliament.) The cyclone organized into a tropical depression in the Andaman Sea on 25 October, though its origins could be traced back to an area of convection in the Sulu Sea four days prior. The disturbance gradually strengthened as it took a west-northwesterly path, reaching cyclonic storm strength the next day. Aided by highly favorable conditions, the storm rapidly intensified, attaining super cyclonic storm intensity on 28 October, before peaking on the next day with winds of 260 km/h (160 mph) and a record-low pressure of 912 hPa mbar 26.93 inHg). The storm maintained this intensity as it made landfall on Odisha on 29 October. The cyclone steadily weakened due to persistent land interaction and dry air, remaining quasi-stationary for two days before slowly drifting offshore as a much weaker system; the storm dissipated on 4 November over the Bay of Bengal.

Although its primary effects were felt in a localized area of India, the outer fringes of the super cyclone impacted Myanmar and Bangladesh. Ten people were killed in the former, while two were killed in the latter by the storm's rainbands. The storm was the most severe to strike Odisha in the 20th century, raking the state and adjacent areas with high storm surge, powerful winds, and torrential rainfall. The storm's impacts exacerbated the damage caused by a very severe cyclone that struck the same region less than two weeks earlier. The 5–6 m (16–20 ft) surge brought water up to 35 km (22 mi) inland, carrying along with it coastal debris, inundating towns and villages. The surge combined with heavy rains to produce widespread flooding, damaging around 1.6 million homes and causing rivers to breach 20,005 flood embankments. The storm's effects destroyed numerous crops, including sugar cane, rice, and other winter-time harvests. Although estimates of the death toll varied significantly—at times suggesting 30,000 fatalities—the Government of India enumerated 9,887 fatalities in the country, of which a majority were caused by storm surge; over 8,000 deaths occurred in Jagatsinghpur. The total damage cost of the destruction wrought by the super cyclone amounted to US$4.44 billion. (Note: Monetary figures are in their originally reported currency. Conversions to United States dollar were made through Oanda using 29 October 1999 exchange rates unless otherwise noted.)

Recovery efforts were extensive following the storm's passage. The Government of India allocated ₹3 billion (US$69.3 million) to the Odisha state government, supplementing earlier contributions made towards relief from the earlier cyclone. Various branches of the Indian Armed Forces were dispatched to aid the recovery efforts. Contributions from foreign governments amounted to nearly US$13 million, with more than half allocated by the United States. Alongside foreign and domestic government contributions, between 12 and 14 international aid agencies concurrently participated in relief efforts in the storm's aftermath.

== Meteorological history ==
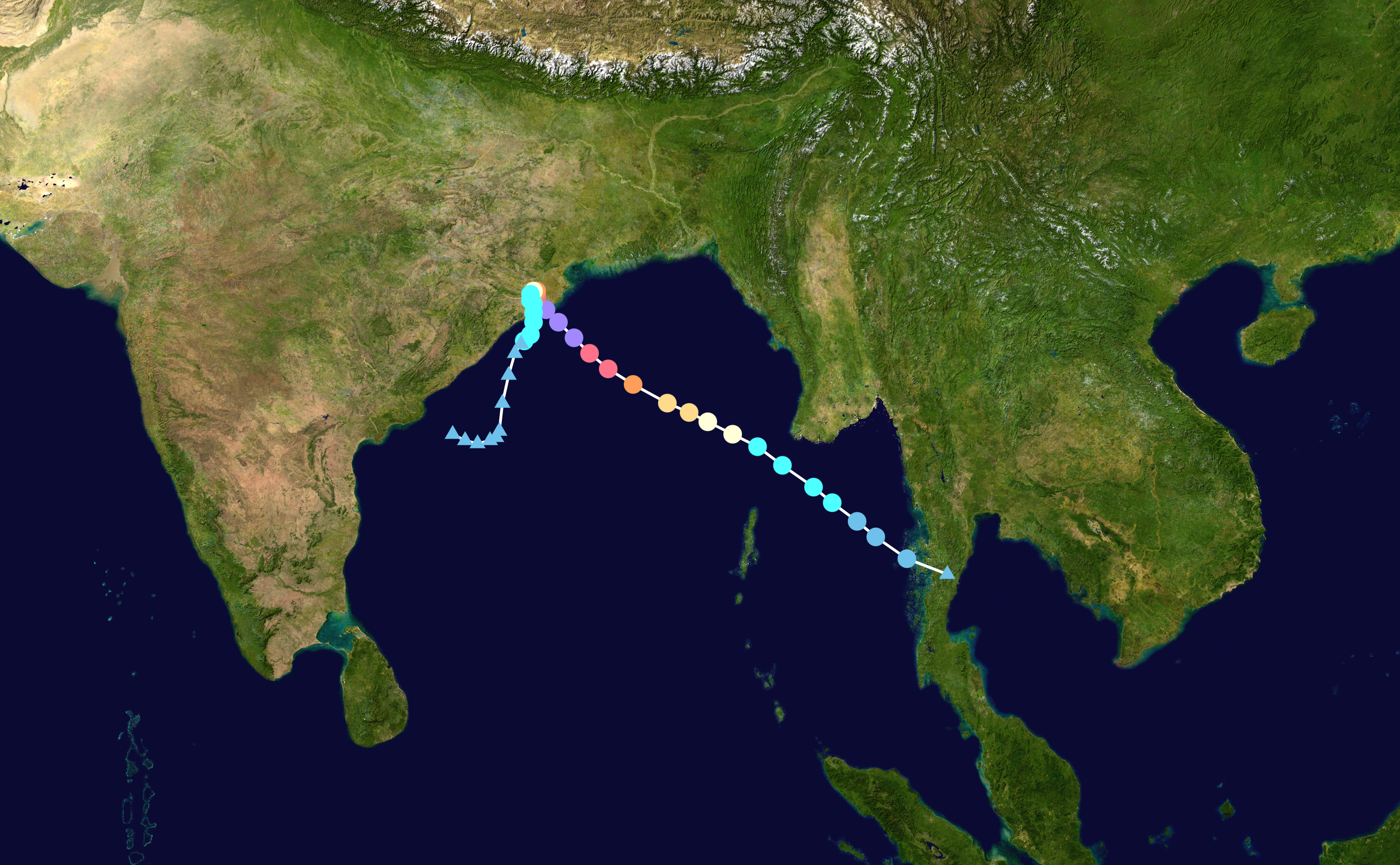
Map plotting the storm's track and intensity, according to the Saffir–Simpson scale Map key Saffir–Simpson scale Tropical depression (≤38 mph, ≤62 km/h) Tropical storm (39–73 mph, 63–118 km/h) Category 1 (74–95 mph, 119–153 km/h) Category 2 (96–110 mph, 154–177 km/h) Category 3 (111–129 mph, 178–208 km/h) Category 4 (130–156 mph, 209–251 km/h) Category 5 (≥157 mph, ≥252 km/h) Unknown Storm type Tropical cyclone Subtropical cyclone Extratropical cyclone, remnant low, tropical disturbance, or monsoon depression

Although the storm organized into a tropical cyclone in the Andaman Sea, the origins of the 1999 Odisha cyclone can be traced back to an area of convection that began developing in the Sulu Sea on 21 October. (Note: All dates are based on Coordinated Universal Time unless otherwise noted.) Despite some signs of development, wind shear suppressed outflow and prevented any significant organization. Tracking westward, the disturbance encountered a more favorable environment in the South China Sea; as a result, thunderstorm activity began to increase. Prompted by these changes, the Joint Typhoon Warning Center (JTWC) issued a Tropical Cyclone Formation Alert (TCFA) at 02:00 UTC on 23 October. However, the system failed to develop any further before wind shear reemerged in the Gulf of Thailand, causing convection to diminish and resulting in the cancellation of the TCFA. On 24 October, the storm crossed the Malay Peninsula and moved into the Andaman Sea by 03:00 UTC on the following day. Although the environment remained moderately unfavorable for tropical cyclogenesis, the disturbance organized, developing fair outflow, a strong rainband, and additional convection. At 06:00 UTC on 25 October, the system became a tropical depression while centered 550 km (340 mi) east of Port Blair. As such, the India Meteorological Department (IMD) designated the system as BOB 06. (Note: This identification convention is established by the World Meteorological Organization. The designation BOB 06 indicates that the storm was the sixth to form in the Bay of Bengal that year. This was the primary system used by the IMD to identify cyclones until 2004, when names were introduced.) With the storm now steadily organizing, the JTWC once again issued a TCFA at 19:30 UTC on 25 October; early the following day, the IMD assessed that the nascent depression had strengthened into a cyclonic storm. At the time, the storm was located 325 km (202 mi) south-southeast of Rangoon, Myanmar.

Under the steering influence of an upper-level ridge to its northeast, BOB 06 began to take a more northwesterly course. The ridge also provided a highly conducive environment for intensification and eventually became positioned atop the strengthening cyclonic storm, slowing the cyclone and allowing it to generate good outflow. With these conditions in place, BOB 06 entered a phase of rapid intensification, strengthening faster than climatological rates. BOB 06 strengthened into a severe cyclonic storm at 03:00 UTC on 27 October and attained very severe cyclonic storm intensity just nine hours later with the storm centered 650 km (400 mi) south of Chittagong, Bangladesh. An eye emerged on visible satellite imagery early on 28 October, and at 15:00 UTC that day, the IMD classified BOB 06 as a super cyclonic storm, the highest rating on the IMD's cyclone scale. Using the Dvorak technique, the IMD estimated that BOB 06 reached its peak intensity three hours later with maximum sustained winds of 260 km/h (160 mph) and a minimum barometric pressure of 912 mbar (hPa; 26.93 inHg); this made BOB 06 the strongest tropical cyclone ever recorded in the North Indian Ocean by pressure with sustained winds at the time matched by only two other known cyclones in the Bay of Bengal. At the time, the 1977 Andhra Pradesh cyclone was the only storm in the region of comparable intensity. Although the storm's organization and appearance deteriorated as it neared land, BOB 06's intensity held steady up until it made landfall on the Odisha coast between Puri and Kendrapara at 06:00 UTC on 29 October.

Rather than moving inland as forecast, the tropical cyclone became quasi-stationary over the coastal Jajpur area as it laid within a weak steering region between two upper-level anticyclones. Remaining situated over land, the storm steadily weakened as it began to advect dry air into its circulation, deteriorating into a cyclonic storm on 30 October. The entraining of dry air limited thunderstorm activity to a single rainband to the system's northeast. Soon, the weakening storm became caught in a mid-tropospheric wind flow, inducing a southward drift that brought BOB 06 back over the Bay of Bengal. The cyclone continued to weaken over water, and the IMD stopped monitoring the storm on 31 October; the JTWC followed suit a day later. The remnant low-pressure system continued to meander around the area for a few more days before eventually dissipating.

== Preparations ==
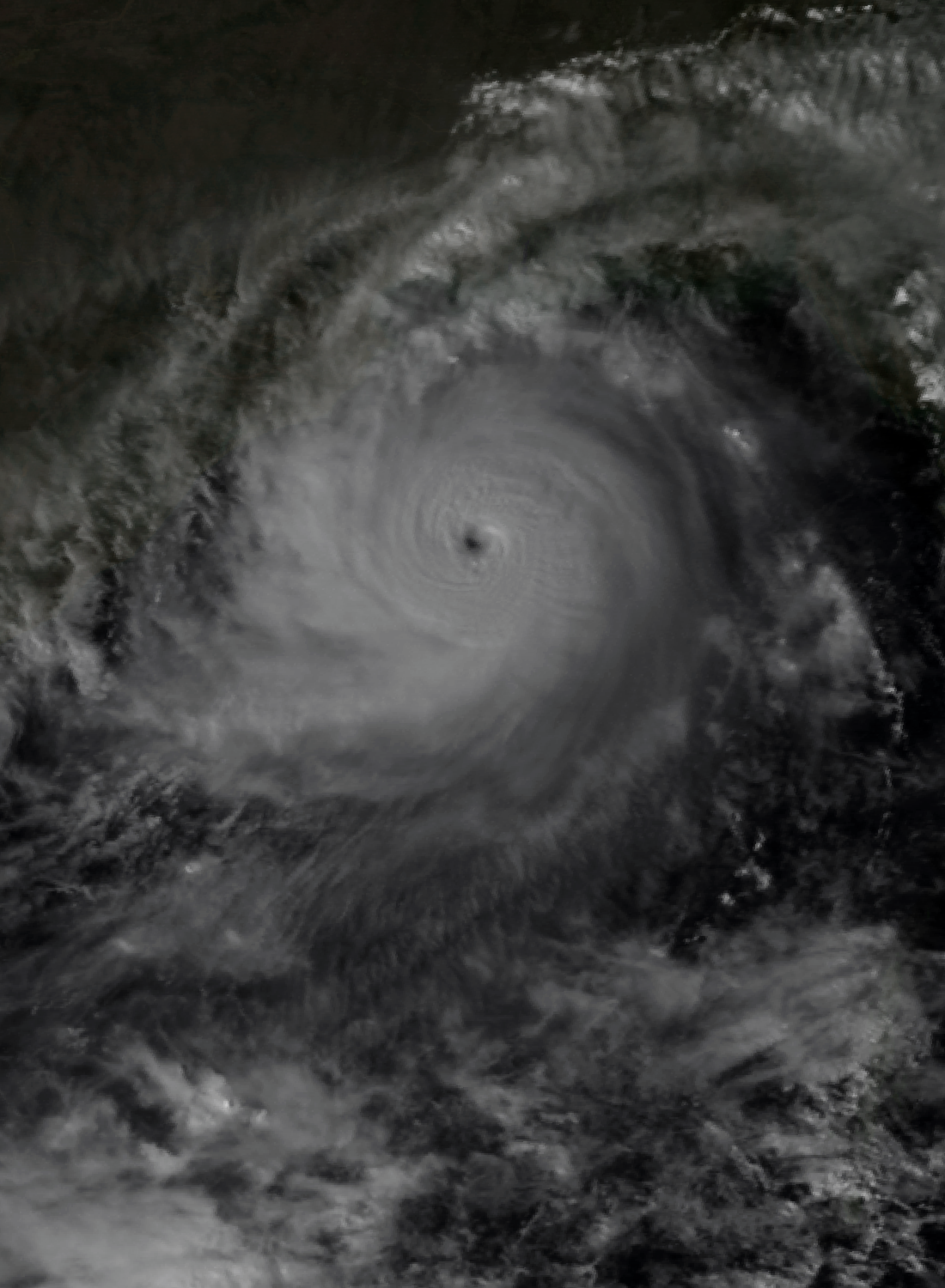
Cyclone 05B as it was rapidly intensifying on 28 October. At the time, it was classified as a very severe cyclonic storm.

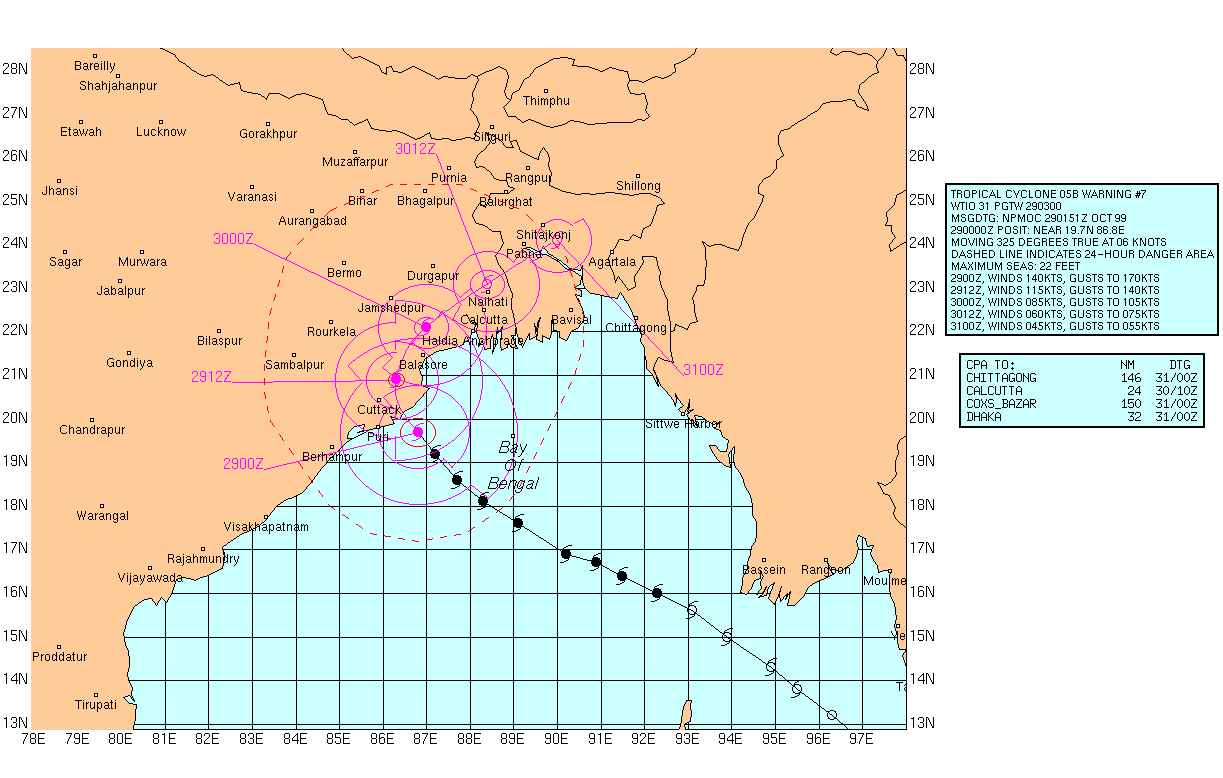
Forecasted track of Cyclone 05B on October 29, 1999, forecasted to turn towards Bangladesh after landfall.

The India Meteorological Department periodically issued cyclone warning bulletins during the storm's lifetime, with the first being directed to the Chief Secretary of the Andaman and Nicobar Islands on 26 October; the first bulletin noted potential impacts and advised fishermen not to venture out to sea. Six warnings were issued for the islands, with the last being issued on 27 October once the storm passed to the north and west. Due to initial uncertainty in the storm's forecast track, the first warnings for the coast of mainland India on 27 October concerned northern Andhra Pradesh, Odisha, and West Bengal. Hourly dissemination of cyclone bulletins were carried out by Doordarshan and All India Radio beginning on 28 October. These warnings eventually narrowed in scope to the eventually affected areas, with the last warning being issued for Odisha on 31 October.

The Indian Department of Agriculture and Cooperation (DAC) served as the primary administrative body for coordinating preparatory and relief work during the 1999 Odisha cyclone. Upon the storm's formation, the DAC requested the chief secretaries and relief commissioners of Andhra Pradesh, Odisha, and West Bengal to begin storm preparations and initiate evacuations if necessary. Evacuations in Odisha involved nearly 150,000 people living within 10 km (6.2 mi) of the coastline in five districts. Six districts maintained 23 permanent cyclone shelters operated by the Indian Red Cross Society, eventually serving to house 30,000 evacuees. At Paradip Port, twelve docked ships were evacuated out to sea to avoid the cyclone. In neighboring West Bengal, 200,000 people were evacuated from the state's vulnerable low-lying islands. The Indian Army was placed on stand-by, and food supplies were stocked up in prone regions. Train service was cancelled for the areas expected to be impacted by the cyclone.

== Impact ==
=== Myanmar and Bangladesh ===
In Myanmar, 10 people were killed and 20,000 families were displaced.

Passing south of Bangladesh, the 1999 Odisha super cyclone's northern fringes swept across the country, killing two people and initially causing 200 fishermen to go missing. Substantial damage to housing was reported.

=== India ===
Effects in Odisha

Casualties
District	Deaths	Affected population	Houses damaged
Balasore	51	1,228,000	96,830
Bhadrak	98	1,347,000	116,880
Cuttack	471	2,367,000	433,000
Dhenkanal	55	70,000	62,230
Jagatsinghpur	8,119	1,200,000	284,337
Jajpur	188	1,550,000	249,893
Kendrapada	469	1,400,000	279,091
Keonjhar	91	2,500,000	55,200
Khurda	91	1,311,000	95,540
Puri	301	1,500,000	134,841
Mayurbhanj	10	198,000	9,500
Nayagarh	3	11,190	11,190
Totals	9,887	12,571,000	1,828,532

The state of Odisha sustained the most catastrophic damage associated with Cyclone BOB 06, which was considered the state's severest cyclone of the 20th century. The damage was compounded by the earlier impact of a very severe cyclonic storm that struck nearby areas just 11 days earlier. Twelve districts of Odisha suffered severe damage, reporting complete breakdown of essential services: Balasore, Bhadrak, Cuttack, Dhenkanal, Jagatsinghpur, Jajpur, Keonjhar, Kendrapara, Khurda, Puri, Mayurbhanj, and Nayagarh. Among these, the blocks of Erasma and Kujang in Jagatsinghpur were the worst affected. In total, 12.9 million people were affected by the storm; estimates for the storm's death toll vary significantly, though the India Meteorological Department indicated that around 9,887 were killed, with an additional 40 persons missing and 2,507 others injured. The majority of these deaths occurred in Jagatsinghpur. where 8,119 were killed. The Centre for Research on the Epidemiology of Disasters' EM-DAT disaster database indicates that 10,915 people were killed. However, other estimates suggested that the death toll may have been as high as 30,000. The storm's effects damaged 1.6 million homes across 14,643 villages and 97 blocks. In turn, 2.5 million people were marooned. A total of 18,420 km^{2} (7,110 sq mi) (7,110 mi^{2}) of crop land was impacted, and 444,000 livestock casualties were also reported. The sugar cane crop was destroyed alongside other kharif and rabi crops. About 2 million tonnes (2.2 million tons) of the winter rice crop was destroyed. Total damage caused by the destructive cyclone amounted to US$4.4444 billion.

Along the Odisha coast, the cyclone generated a 5–6 m (16–20 ft) storm surge that brought water up to 35 km (22 mi) inland, inundating a large swath of coastal areas. The Indian Ministry of Urban Development estimated a peak storm surge height of 6.7 metres (22 feet). One visually estimated storm surge of 9 metres (30 feet) was reported; however, this estimate was determined to have been too high. Regardless, no in-situ measurement of the peak storm surge exists as all potential instruments were destroyed by the storm. Storm surge was responsible for a majority of the fatalities linked to the 1999 Odisha cyclone, accounting for around 7,000 deaths. The intense wave action sank 9,085 fishing boats and caused the loss of 22,143 fishing nets. Some fishing trawlers were carried and deposited 1.5–2.0 km (0.93–1.24 mi) inland. A 4 km (2.5 mi) stretch of road leading out of Paradip was covered by sand dunes measuring 1 metre (3.3 feet) in height and 0.5 km (0.31 mi) in width. Paradip Port sustained severe damage to several components including various warehouses and its power transmission system, though its core infrastructure remained intact. Damage at the port was estimated at ₹300 million (US$6.9 million). (Note: This conversion from rupees to United States dollars was included in original reporting.) The storm surge destroyed nearly every house in Paradip near the point of landfall. In Gopalpur, 27 villages were submerged by the surge. To the south in southern Andhra Pradesh, 48 trawlers sank. To the north in West Bengal, Substantial damage to housing was reported, causing injuries to 30 people in Midnapore.

Stations in Paradip and Bhubaneswar each recorded sustained winds of 150 km/h (95 mph) before their instruments failed. Winds of 175 km/h (110 mph) were measured in Puri as the cyclone passed to the north. The strong winds damaged electric lines and uprooted trees over 50 years old in Puri and Kendrapada. Downed power lines across the state cut off communications between Odisha and the rest of the world for over 24 hours and caused widespread power outages. According to the Southern Electricity Supply Corporation, damage to the power grid caused by the cyclone totaled ₹330 million (US$4.4 million). Stalling over land, the Odisha cyclone dropped torrential rainfall, with 24-hour rainfall rates at times exceeding 200 mm (7.9 in); Paradip documented 530 mm (21 in) over one 24-hour period. Over the course of the storm's passage, total rainfall amounts over 600 mm (24 in) occurred over a large swath of Odisha. The highest recorded rainfall total was documented in Oupada, which measured 955 mm (37.6 in) of rain over a three-day period. Flooding caused by the storm was estimated to have killed approximately 2,000 people. The heavy rains flattened thatched huts and damaged roads and other infrastructure. Within the seven worst affected districts, over 70% of homes were destroyed; most of these were thatched homes, though 10–15% of non-thatch roofed homes were also destroyed. Approximately 11,000 schools were either significantly damaged or destroyed. All major district roads in the area were either washed out or blocked by felled trees. In Bhubaneswar, 60% of trees were flattened by the winds and rain; aerial surveys revealed that the entire city was submerged by floodwaters. Adjacent areas were nearly stripped of all tree cover. Until 8 November, the city remained without power. The inundation induced by the far-reaching storm surge and heavy rain kept Konark submerged in knee-deep water for six days after landfall. Over the course of four days, the excessive rainfall caused the flooding of the Baitarani, Brahmani, Budhabalanga, Kharasua, and Salandi rivers, resulting in 20,005 flood embankment breaches and the damaging of 6 headworks. Thousands of people suffered chemical burns after the flooding mixed industrial chemicals into bathing ponds. Oswal Chemicals and Fertilisers, which maintained the world's largest diammonium phosphate plant, reported severe damage to the facility. In the five districts most affected, all electric water pumps were disabled, though hand pumps remained operable.

== Aftermath ==
Foreign government contributions
Country	Contribution (USD) (Note: Values converted to United States dollar via Oanda using 29 October 1999 exchange rates)	Source(s)
Australia	$191,700	
Canada	$203,964	
Denmark	$64,361	(Note: Contribution through respective country's branch of the International Federation of Red Cross and Red Crescent Societies.)
European Union	$2,102,000	
Finland	$176,955	
Germany	$234,447	
Netherlands	$238,554	
New Zealand	$99,823	
Sweden	$121,959	
Switzerland	$845,236	
United Kingdom	$1,300,000	
United States	$7,482,000	
Total	$13,060,999	

The Government of India declared a national disaster in the aftermath of the cyclone, though international appeals were initially unanticipated. The destruction wrought by the cyclone was expected to cause a six-month-long total loss of normal livelihood. Damage sustained to various sanitation infrastructure led to a heightened risk of communicable disease outbreaks; indeed, diarrhea and cholera saw increased incidences following the storm's impact. Within a month of the cyclone's landfall, the Odisha state government reported 22,296 cases of diarrheal disorders. The area's vulnerability to disease was also compounded by a lack of pre-storm vaccinations, raising fears of a potential measles outbreak. The outbreak of diseases caused by the storm's effects stabilized by February 2000. For most locations, the initial loss of telecommunication and rail operation was restored within a few days.

Prime Minister of India Atal Bihari Vajpayee announced the allocation of ₹3 billion (US$69.3 million) to the Odisha state government, supplementing an earlier allocation of US$59.5 million made towards relief from the cyclone that struck the region earlier that October. However, the Odisha state government demanded a larger commitment of ₹5 billion (US$73.3 million) for relief alongside ₹25 billion (US$366.7 million) for rehabilitation. The Central government also considered the establishment of a Department for Natural Disaster Management to handle the devastation caused by the cyclone. Ultimately, a "High Powered Task Force" was formed under the command of the Ministry of Defence to provide rehabilitation support. The Indian Army sent infantry, engineers, and signal detachments to assist with disaster relief, including a field medical unit containing 30 ambulances and 340 doctors. Indian Air Force helicopters dropped food packets in affected regions beginning on 30 October, while other government ground personnel distributed various relief supplies including vaccines and plastic sheeting. Due to severe damage to air traffic control infrastructure, the Biju Patnaik International Airport was closed until 2 November, curtailing relief operations. Schools that survived the cyclone were repurposed as temporary shelters for those displaced. Due to the high amount of animal carcasses, the Government of India offered US$3 for every carcass burned–higher than minimum wage. However, backlash led the government to fly in 200 Dalits from New Delhi and 500 from Odisha to carry out the carcass removal.

On 2 November, the Canadian International Development Agency contributed C$150,000 (US$203,964) to the International Federation of the Red Cross to aid the recovery effort; Canada eventually doubled their contributions through the Canadian Lutheran World Relief and CARE. The European Commission channeled €2 million (US$2.1 million) through the European Community Humanitarian Office for use by various relief organizations. Contributions to aid agencies were also made by the British Department for International Development (DFID), with initial contributions made to Christian Aid and CARE totaling £330,000 (US$540,837). DFID's initial emergency assistance was later increased to £3 million (US$4.9 million) and supplemented by a £25 million ($40.9 million) contribution over the course of six months. The Swiss Humanitarian Aid Unit allocated CHF 800,000 (US$779,666) to five Swiss relief organizations operating in India. Food aid worth A$300,000 (US$191,700) was sent by the Australian Government and delivered to approximately 1 million people through the World Food Programme. Other countries sent aid through their respective International Federation of Red Cross and Red Crescent Societies branch. Following an initial disaster declaration by United States Ambassador to India Dick Celeste, the United States Agency for International Development contributed US$7,482,000 through Food for Peace and the Office of Foreign Disaster Assistance to complement recovery efforts. The United Nations Children's Fund allocated more than US$100,000 to help supply basic health and shelter needs, while the United Nations Office for the Coordination of Humanitarian Affairs made a similar allocation through an emergency grant and with reserves from an earlier grant from Norway.

Between 12 and 14 international aid agencies were concurrently active in Odisha in the storm's aftermath. The Odisha Government made appeals to various non-governmental organizations as the government's relief supplies only covered 40% of affected areas. In response to the storm's devastation, Oxfam prepared an initial aid package, including emergency water equipment worth £250,000 (US$306,665) and 50,000 instant meals. Several members of the Action by Churches Together Alliance made contributions to the post-cyclone relief efforts. Lutheran World Relief made initial grants of US$15,000 each to the Church's Auxiliary for Social Action (CASA) and Lutheran World Federation for emergency programs in northeastern India. The United Evangelical Lutheran Churches in India sent US$700,000 worth of various relief supplies in concert with CASA. The Indian Red Cross Society distributed relief supplies from their zonal warehouse in Calcutta, with initial supplies valued at CHF 20,000 (US$19,491). In addition to the Indian society of the Red Cross, a joint Indian and International Federation assessment team was assembled to survey the damage. CARE carried over its preexisting relief operations from the early October cyclone, routing food supplies by train to hard-hit locations in Odisha. The Odisha state branch of the Red Cross extended the emergency relief phase to a three-month relief operation and a six-month rehabilitation program with the help of the Federation. The overall humanitarian response spanned well into late 2000. Bochasanwasi Akshar Purushottam Swaminarayan Sanstha dispatched aid to 91 villages greatly affected by the storm in the Jagatsinghpur and Kendrapada districts; medical camps were established in 32 villages. Three villages were "adopted" by BAPS Charities in January 2000 to rebuild in Jagatsinghpur: Chakulia, Banipat, and Potak. A total of 200 concrete homes were constructed, as well as two concrete schools and two village tube-wells. The project was finally completed in May 2002, two and a half years after the cyclone hit. Similarly, Oxfam facilitated various restoration projects in the Ganjam district, including in the communities of Denotified Tribes.

Runoff caused by the cyclone enhanced available nutrients in the Bay of Bengal, supplementing the already present equatorward ocean current and resulting in an increase in chlorophyll a and particulate organic carbon in the region.

== See also ==
- 1970 Bhola cyclone – The deadliest tropical cyclone recorded worldwide
- 1977 Andhra Pradesh cyclone – considered India's first confirmed super cyclonic storm
- Cyclone Gonu (2007) – The most powerful tropical cyclone recorded in the Arabian Sea
- Cyclone Nargis (2008) – The sixth-deadliest tropical cyclone recorded worldwide, also the second costliest tropical cyclone recorded in the North Indian Ocean
- Cyclone Phailin (2013) – a powerful Category 5-equivalent tropical cyclone that made landfall near the same location as the 1999 Odisha cyclone
- Cyclone Hudhud (2014) – costly and powerful Category 4 tropical cyclone, with impacts extending from Visakhapatnam into Nepal
- Cyclone Fani (2019) – Another cyclone that also impacted Odisha 20 years later
- Kathantara – an Odia disaster film based on the 1999 Odisha cyclone
