= 1999 North Indian Ocean cyclone season =

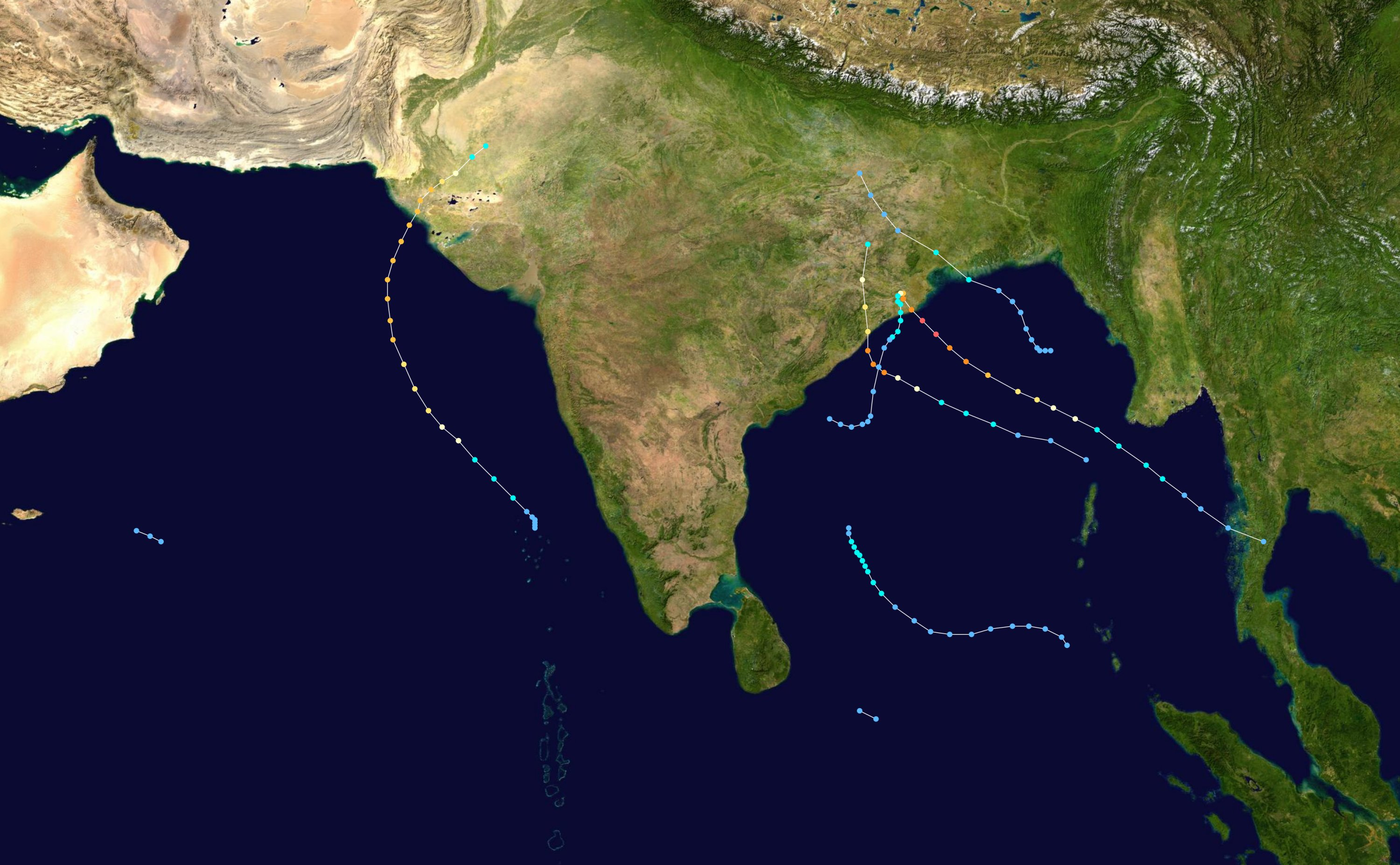
- Season summary map

Seasonal boundaries
- First system formed: January 30, 1999
- Last system dissipated: December 10, 1999

Strongest storm
- Name: BOB 06 (Most intense tropical cyclone in the North Indian Ocean on record)
  - Maximum winds: 260 km/h (160 mph) (3-minute sustained)
  - Lowest pressure: 912 hPa (mbar)

Seasonal statistics
- Depressions: 8, 2 unofficial
- Deep depressions: 6, 2 unofficial
- Cyclonic storms: 4, 1 unofficial
- Severe cyclonic storms: 4
- Very severe cyclonic storms: 3
- Extremely severe cyclonic storms: 3 (record high, tied with 2019 and 2023)
- Super cyclonic storms: 1
- Total fatalities: At least 16,485 total
- Total damage: $5.446 billion (1999 USD)

Related articles
- 1999 Atlantic hurricane season; 1999 Pacific hurricane season; 1999 Pacific typhoon season

The 1999 North Indian Ocean cyclone season was an extremely active and deadly tropical cyclone season in recent times. It was an event in the annual cycle of tropical cyclone formation. The North Indian Ocean cyclone season has no official bounds, but cyclones tend to form between April and December, with peaks in May and October-November. These dates conventionally delimit the period of each year when most tropical cyclones form in the northern Indian Ocean.

The scope of this article is limited to the Indian Ocean in the Northern Hemisphere, east of the Horn of Africa and west of the Malay Peninsula. There are two main seas in the North Indian Ocean – the Arabian Sea to the west of the Indian subcontinent, abbreviated ARB by the India Meteorological Department (IMD); and the Bay of Bengal to the east, abbreviated BOB by the IMD.

The official Regional Specialized Meteorological Centre in this basin is the India Meteorological Department (IMD), while the Joint Typhoon Warning Center releases unofficial advisories. The tropical cyclone scale for this basin is detailed on the right. On average, 4 to 6 storms form in this basin every season.

The season produced an above-average number of cyclonic storms but there was a very above-average number of intense cyclones. In May, a Category 3 cyclone struck Pakistan, leaving 6,400 people dead. In October, two very intense cyclones struck eastern India within two weeks of each other with the latter becoming the most intense Northern Indian Ocean cyclone on record, leaving over 10,000 people dead and causing more than $5.4 billion (1999 USD) in damages.

== Season summary ==
During the 1999 season, a total of ten tropical cyclones were observed. The India Meteorological Department, the official Regional Specialized Meteorological Center of the North Indian Ocean basin, identified eight of them. The Joint Typhoon Warning Center unofficially tracked two additional cyclones, 03B and 31W, during the course of the season.

== Systems ==
=== Severe Cyclonic Storm BOB 01 ===
- Severe cyclonic storm (IMD)
- Tropical storm (SSHWS)
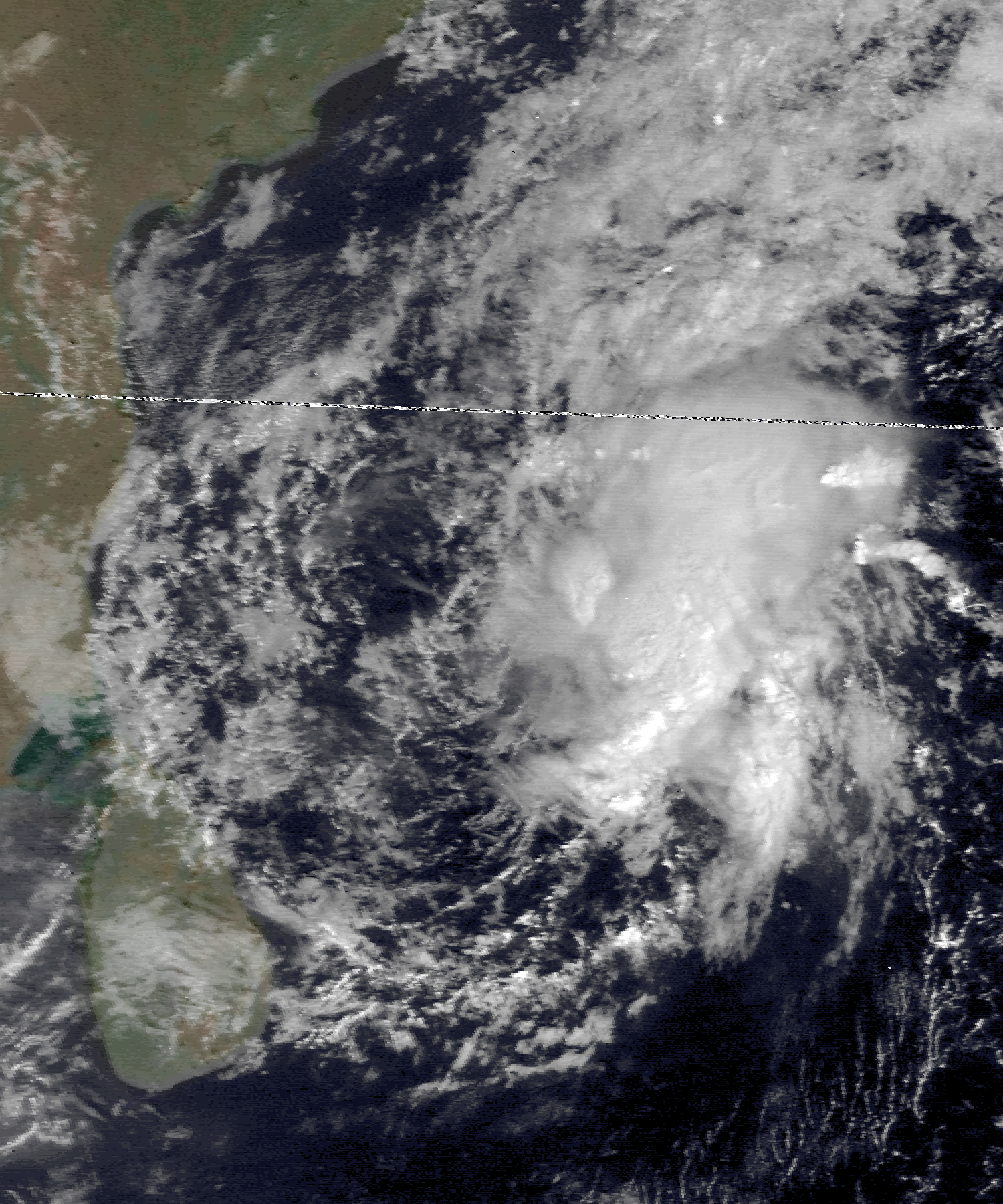
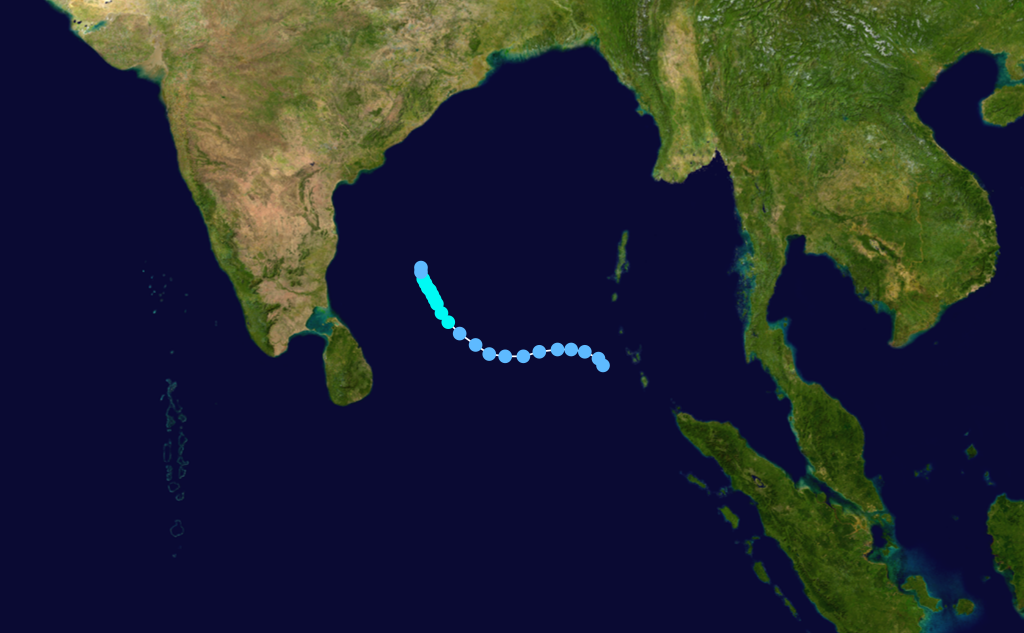
- Duration: February 2 – February 5
- Peak intensity: 95 km/h (60 mph) (3-min); 998 hPa (mbar)

On January 30, an area of disturbed weather began to develop. Convection began to form around the center and a Tropical Cyclone Formation Alert was issued the next day by the JTWC. Development of the storm stalled and the alert was cancelled. The next day, another TCFA was issued but was once more cancelled. Finally, on February 2, after the third TCFA was issued, the low pressure area developed into a tropical storm at 0900Z 370 nm west of Phuket, Thailand. The storm slowly intensified and reached its peak of 45 mph (1-min) on February 3. Shortly after peaking in intensity, vertical wind shear weakened the storm and the low became exposed by 1800Z the same day. The storm later dissipated on February 5 without making landfall.

=== Extremely Severe Cyclonic Storm ARB 01 (02A) ===
- Extremely severe cyclonic storm (IMD)
- Category 3 tropical cyclone (SSHWS)
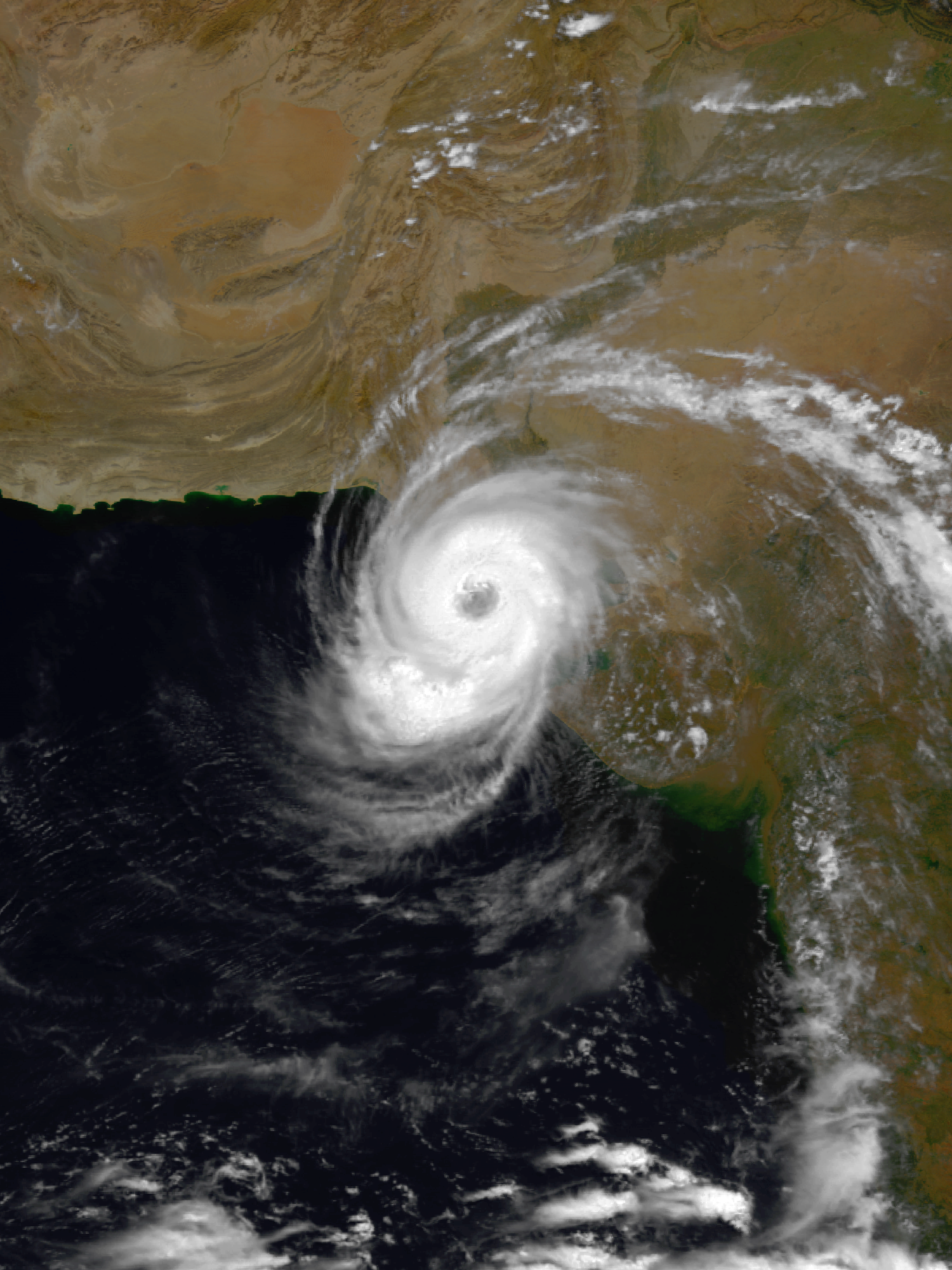
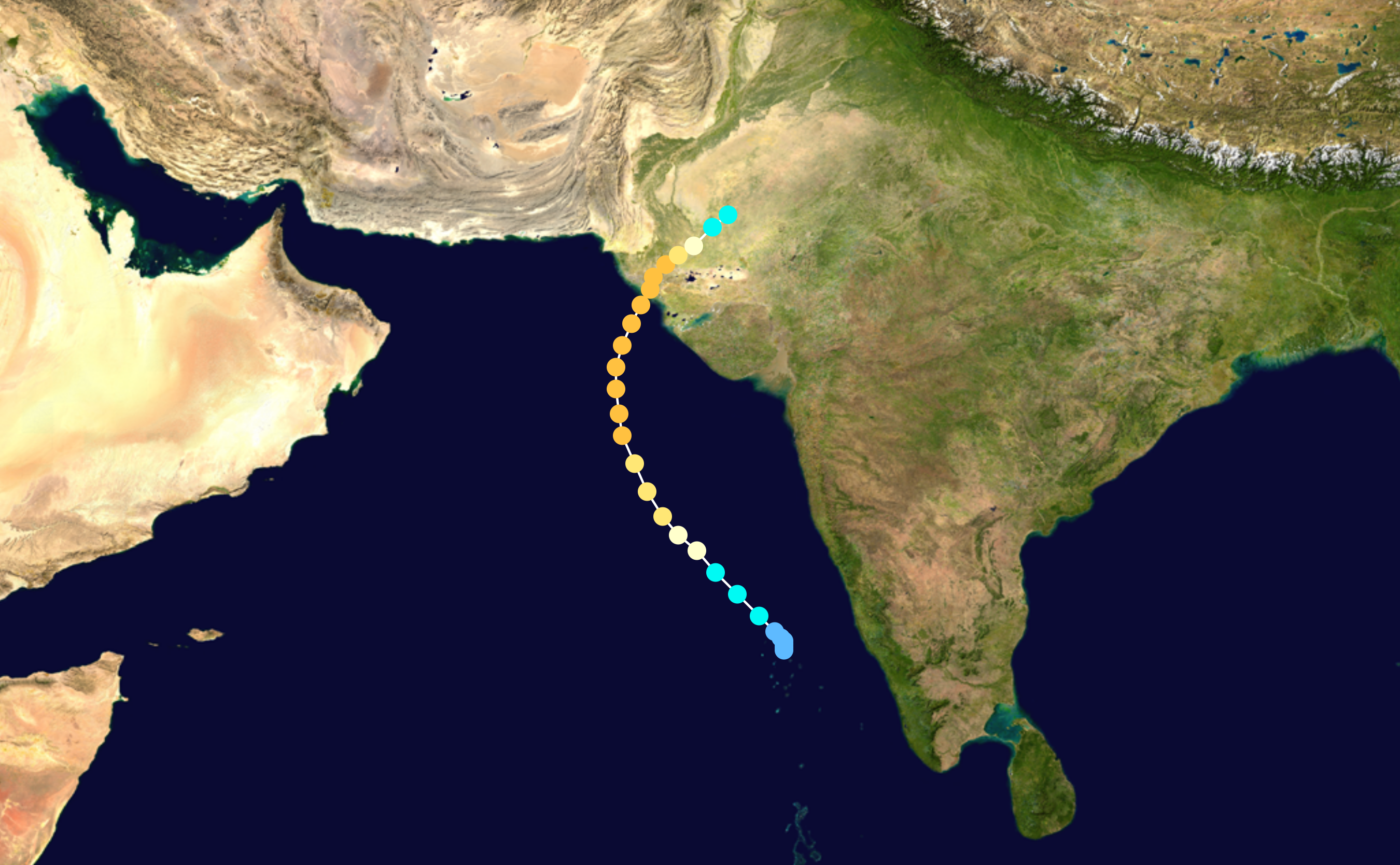
- Duration: May 16 – May 22
- Peak intensity: 195 km/h (120 mph) (3-min); 946 hPa (mbar)

An area of disturbed weather in the Arabian Sea was monitored in early May for possible development. Over the next two weeks, strong convection would develop before sunrise but dissipate by sunset. By May 16, the convection had become constant and a TCFA was issued at 0100Z. The low became a tropical storm by 0900Z. Tropical Storm 02A intensified as it moved to the northwest and reached cyclone status on May 17 at 0600Z. At that time, a mid-latitude trough weakened the subtropical ridge, allowing 02A to curve into Pakistan. 02A continued to intensify and by May 19, it had reached its peak of 125 mph (205 km/h), just below Category four status on the SSHS. 02A made landfall on May 20 near Karachi, Pakistan at peak intensity. The storm began to dissipate as it continued inland over the Indus River Valley on May 21 and completely dissipated the next day.

The cyclone struck the same area which had been hit hard by Tropical Cyclone 03A, a category three as well, almost exactly a year prior. It proved to be very deadly with 6,400 people reported to be dead. Damages totaled to $6 million (1999 USD).

02A was the strongest storm to ever form in the Arabian Sea until 2001, when cyclone 01A became the strongest storm to form in the Arabian Sea. It was itself surpassed in 2007 when Cyclone Gonu became the first category five to form in the Arabian Sea. That would itself be surpassed again in 2019 when Cyclone Kyarr became the most intense system in the Arabian Sea.

=== Tropical Storm 03B ===
- Tropical storm (SSHWS)
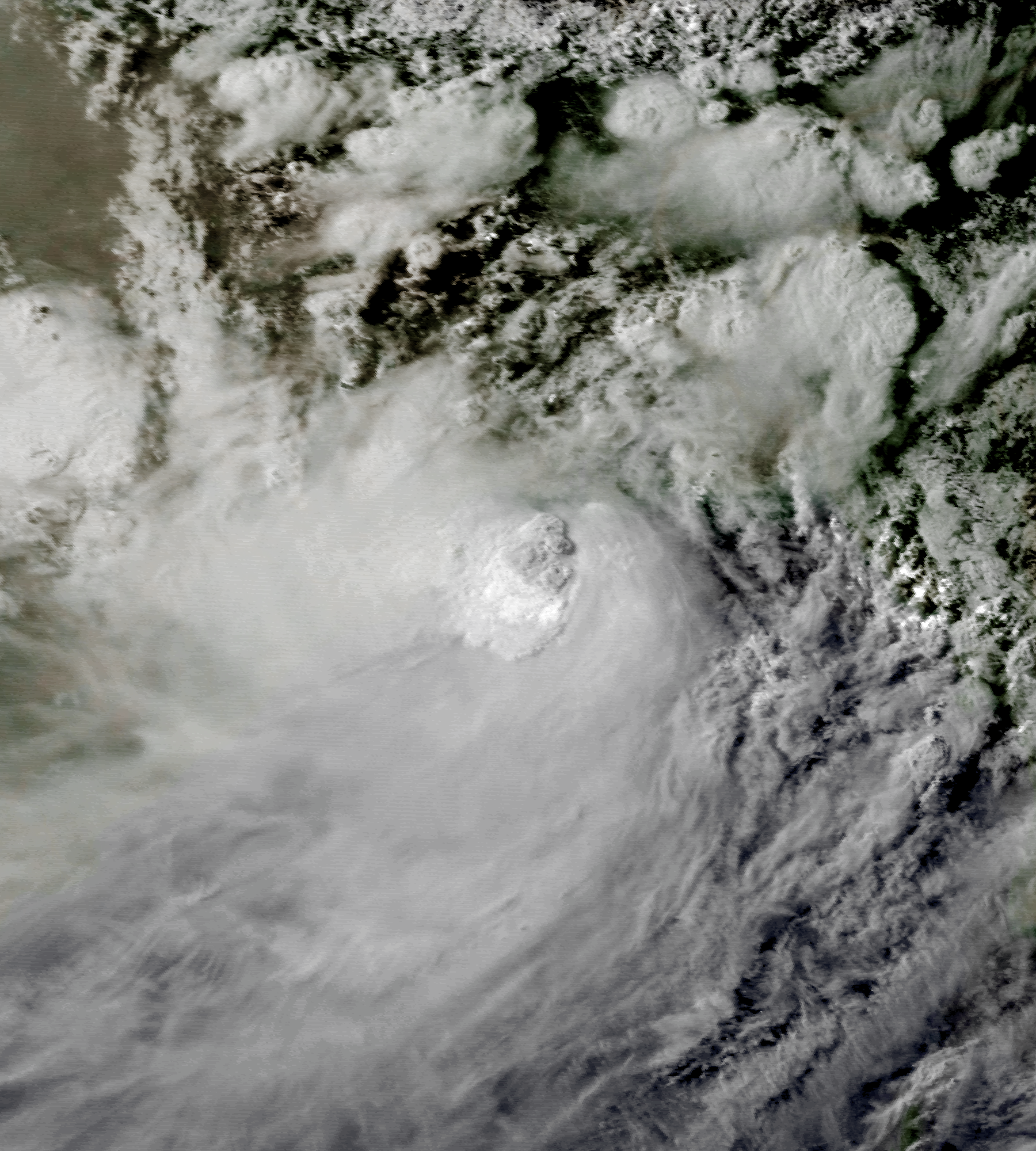
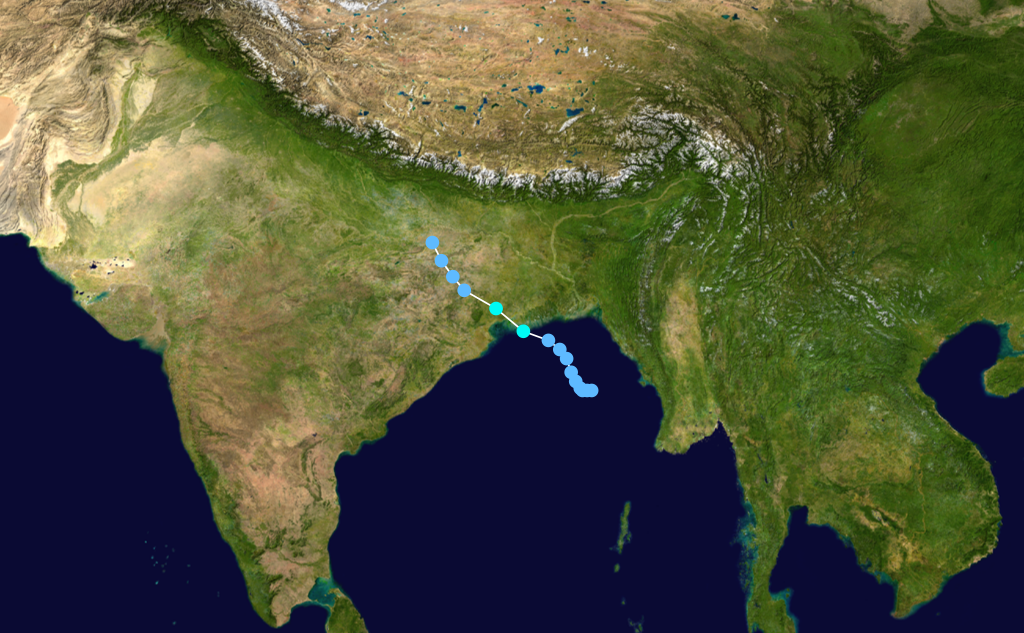
- Duration: June 8 – June 11
- Peak intensity: 65 km/h (40 mph) (1-min); 997 hPa (mbar)

On June 8, an area of low pressure formed 235 nm south of Chittagong, Bangladesh. The low slowly developed over the next two days while drifting to the west and northwest. On June 10, a TCFA was issued at 0830Z and the first warning on Tropical Storm 03B was issued at 1500Z the same day. The storm made landfall as a minimal tropical storm to the west of Calcutta, India later that day. 03B rapidly weakened due to vertical wind shear and the interaction with land and dissipated on June 11. No fatalities or damages have been associated with 03B.

=== Deep Depression BOB 02 ===
- Deep depression (IMD)
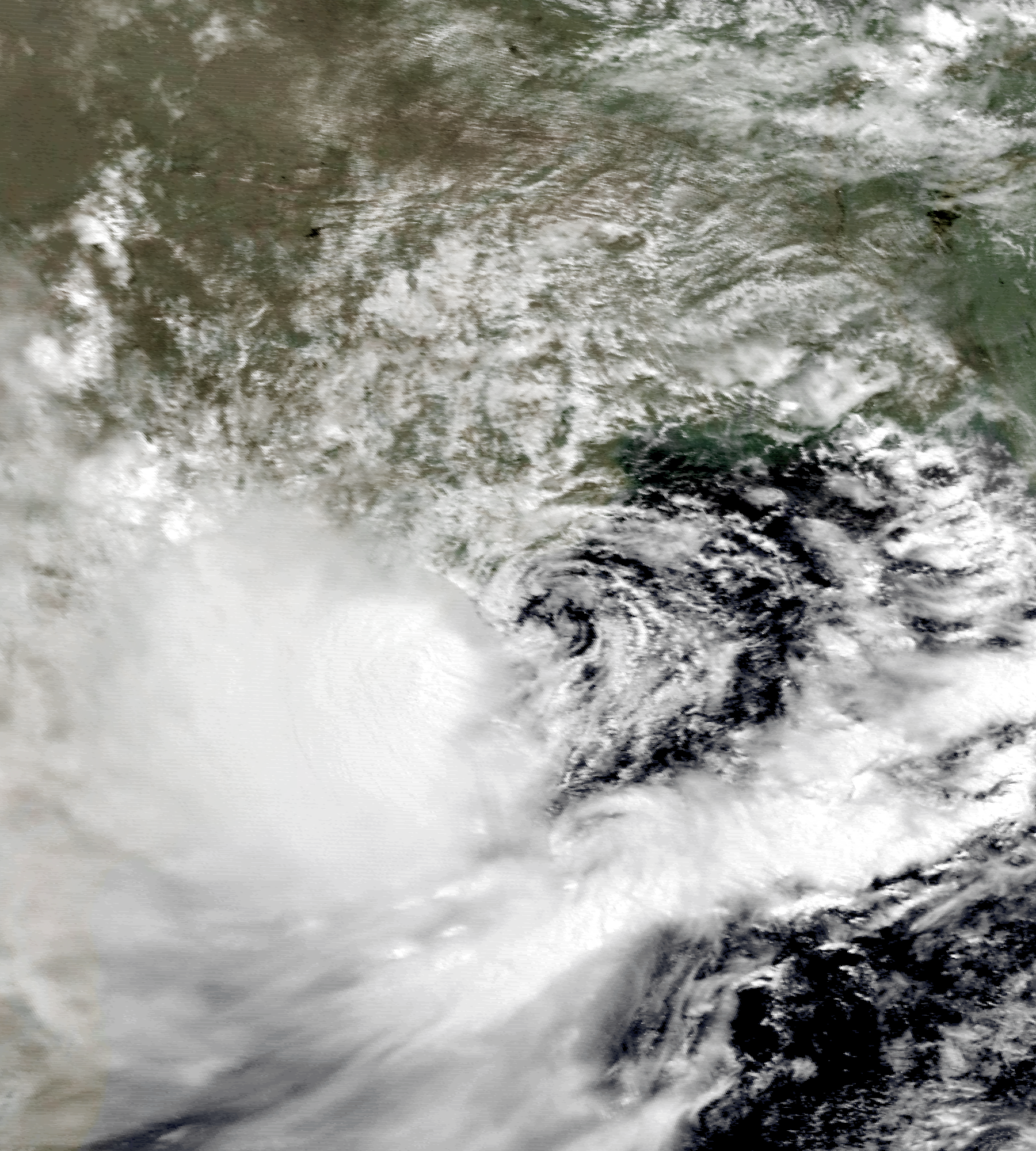
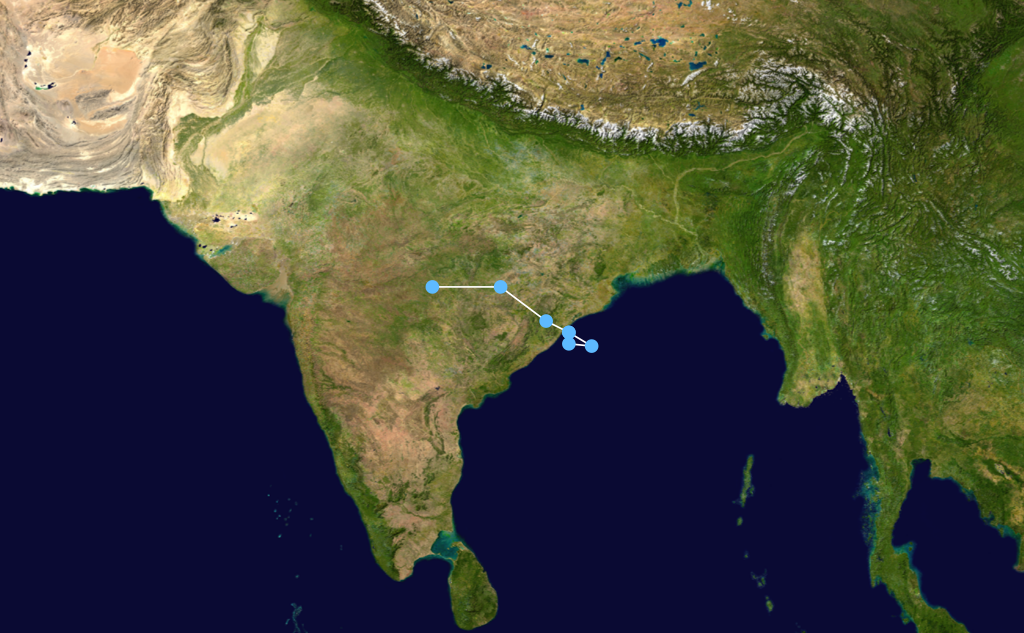
- Duration: June 17 – June 17
- Peak intensity: 55 km/h (35 mph) (3-min); 986 hPa (mbar)

A weak depression existed on June 17 before it made landfall near Berhampur. The depression was monitored by the IMD, not the JTWC.

=== Deep Depression BOB 03 ===
- Deep depression (IMD)
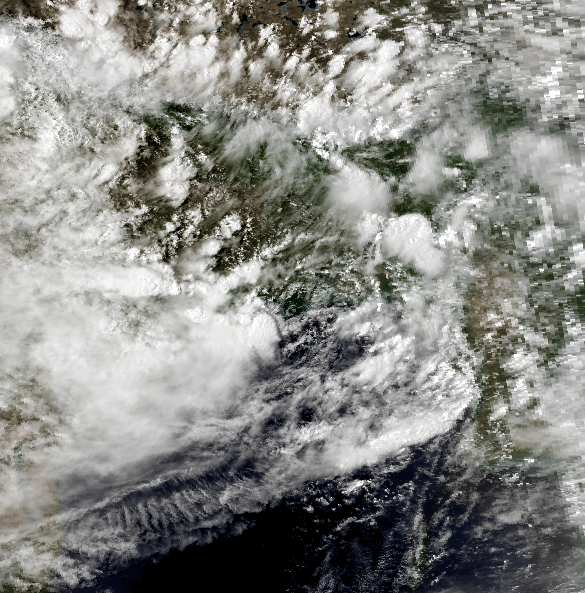
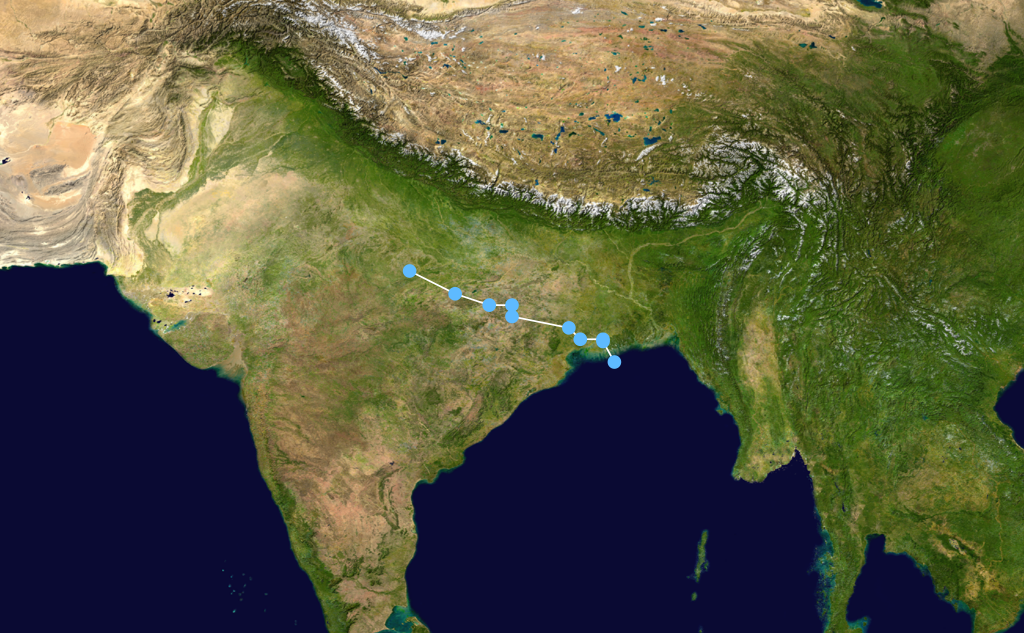
- Duration: July 27 – July 28
- Peak intensity: 55 km/h (35 mph) (3-min); 990 hPa (mbar)

A depression formed on July 27, strengthened slightly before moving inland into the Odisha state on July 28. The depression was monitored by the IMD, not the JTWC.

=== Depression BOB 04 ===
- Depression (IMD)
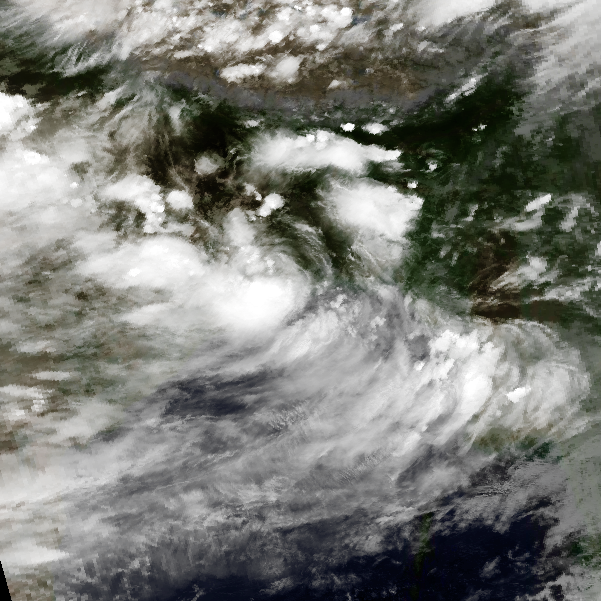
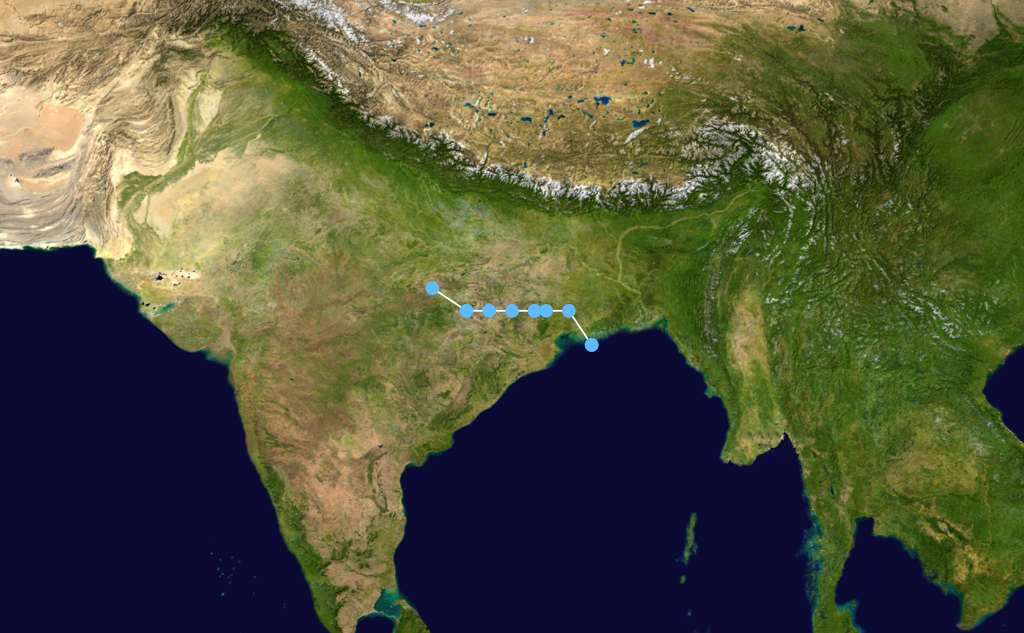
- Duration: August 6 – August 9
- Peak intensity: 45 km/h (30 mph) (3-min); 992 hPa (mbar)

A depression formed in the northern Bay of Bengal on August 6 and moved inland into the Odisha state the next day. It was dissipated by August 8. The depression was monitored by the IMD, not the JTWC.

=== Extremely Severe Cyclonic Storm BOB 05 (04B) ===
- Extremely severe cyclonic storm (IMD)
- Category 4 tropical cyclone (SSHWS)
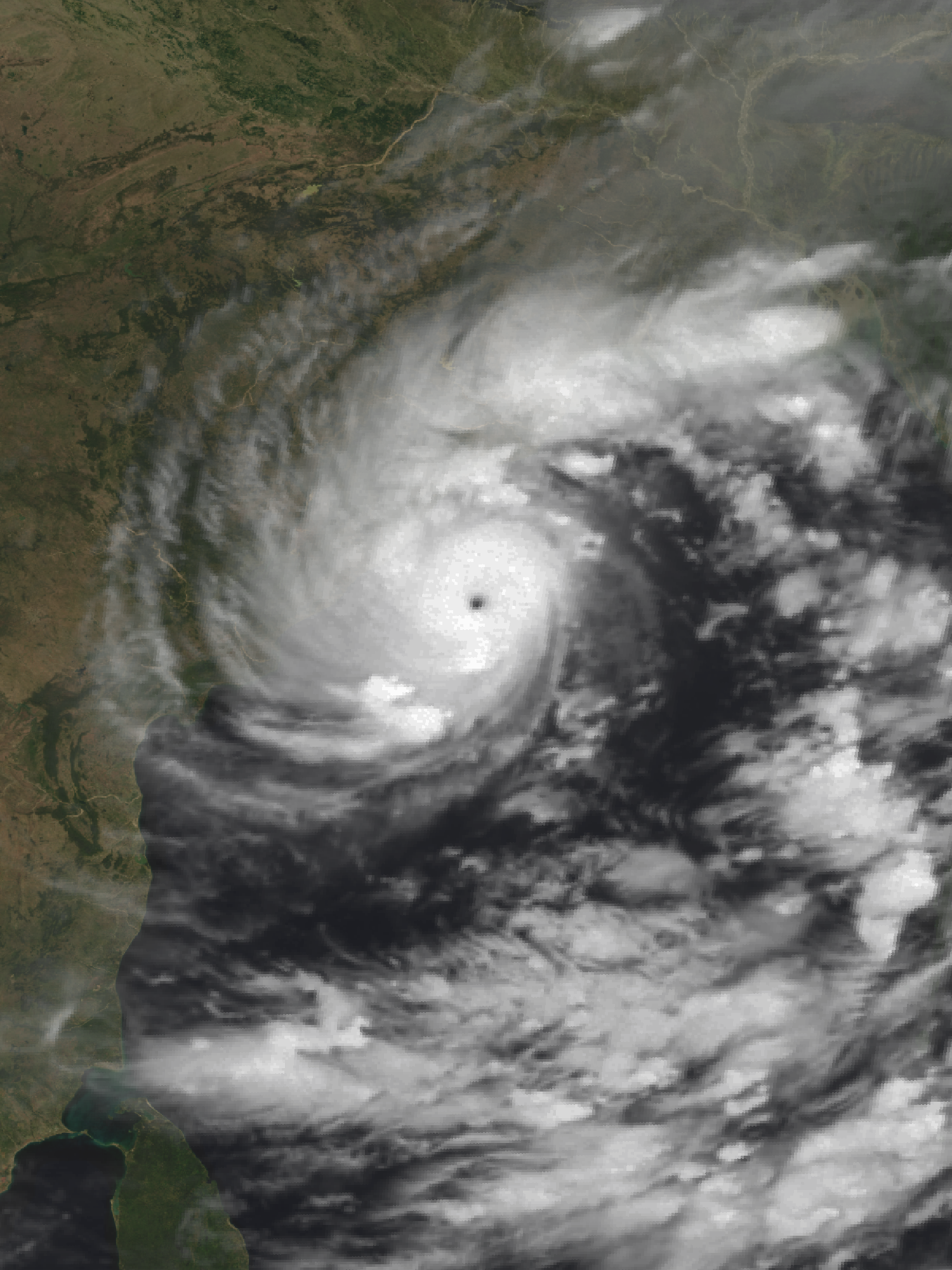
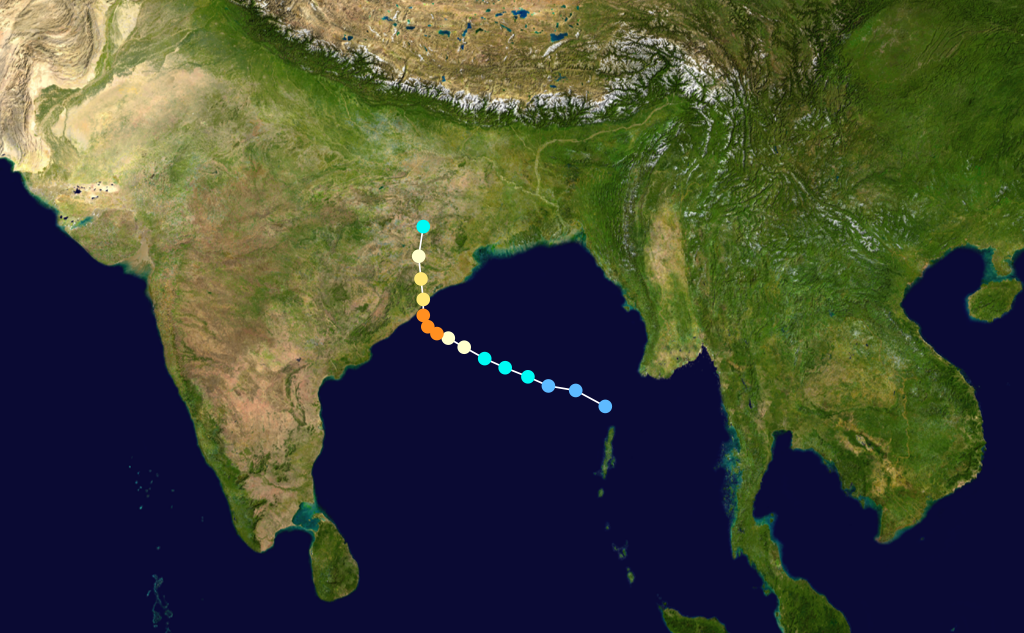
- Duration: October 15 – October 19
- Peak intensity: 215 km/h (130 mph) (3-min); 968 hPa (mbar)

On October 15, a developing area of low pressure, located 220 nm northwest of the Andaman Islands began to intensify. By 1730Z a TCFA was issued and the first advisory on Tropical Storm 04B was issued at 2100Z. 04B was moving to the west-northwest at 8–12 knots as it continued to intensify. On October 17, the storm began to turn to a more northerly direction as it intensified to a cyclone. 04B underwent explosive intensification the same day and reached its peak of 140 mph at 0000Z. The storm held this intensity as it made landfall on the Odisha coastline near Gopalpur beach. The storm began to weaken due to the interaction with land and dissipated on October 19.

04B was responsible for 198 fatalities and hundreds of houses and huts in low-lying areas were destroyed by flooding. Several thousand others were injured by the storm and hundreds were left homeless. The Prime Minister of India requested that relief supplies be distributed to the affected region immediately.

=== Super Cyclonic Storm BOB 06 (05B) ===
- Super cyclonic storm (IMD)
- Category 5 tropical cyclone (SSHWS)
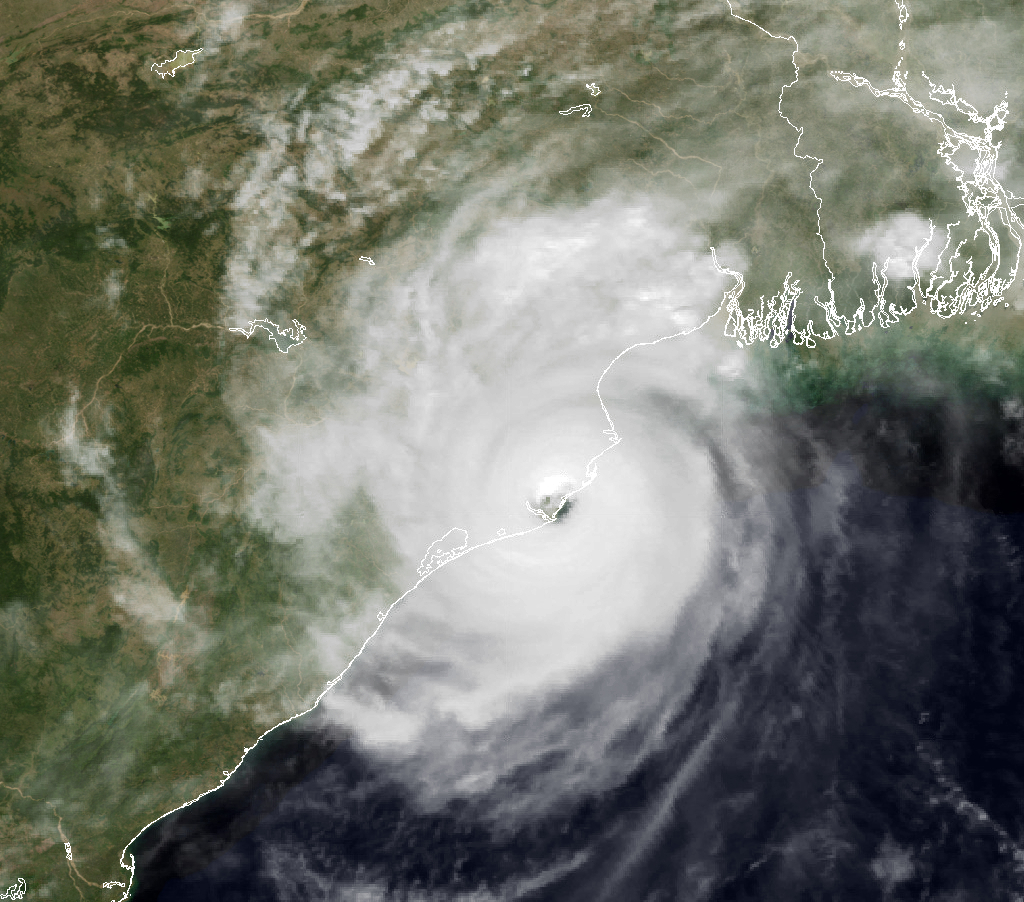
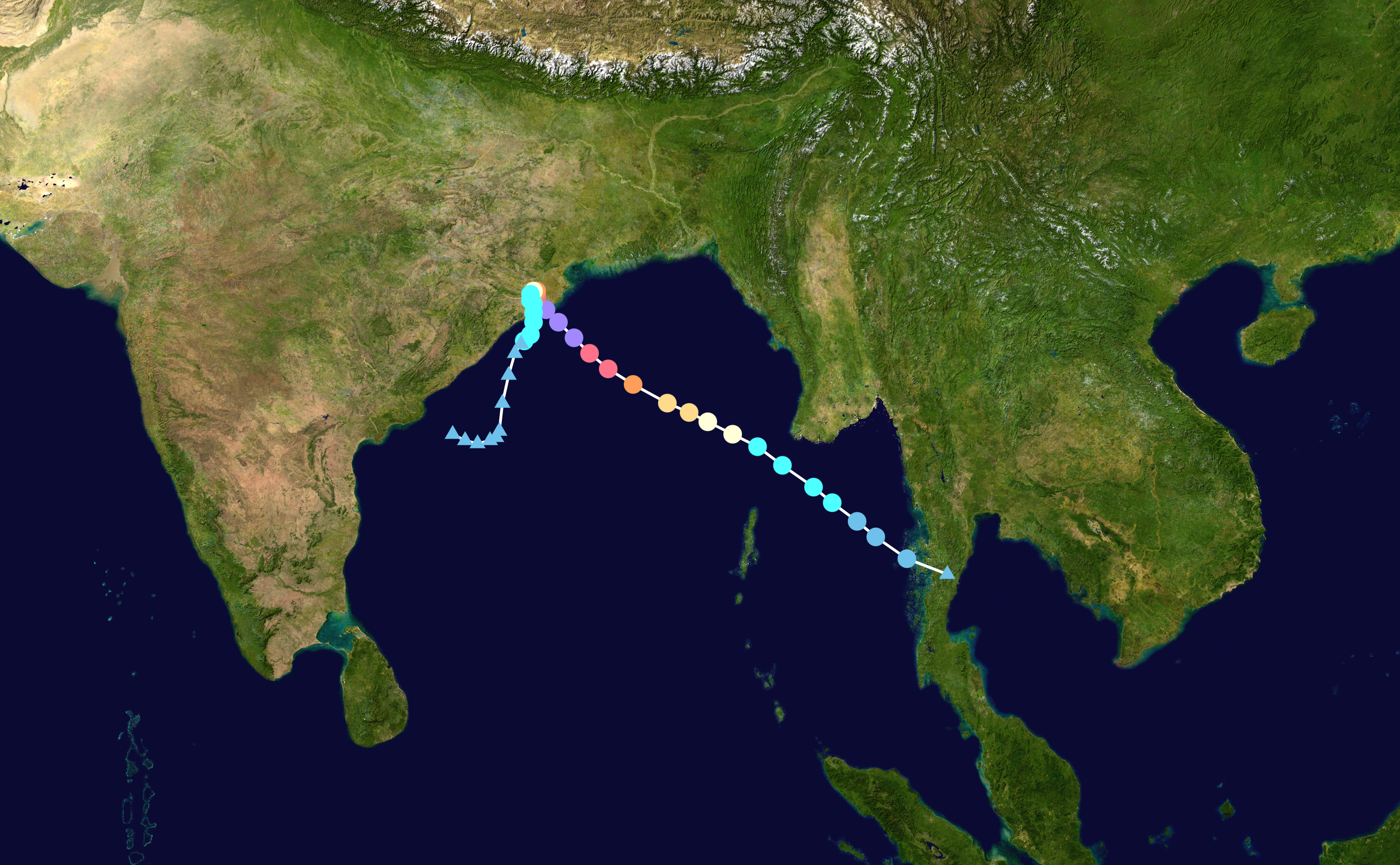
- Duration: October 25 – November 3
- Peak intensity: 260 km/h (160 mph) (3-min); 912 hPa (mbar)

On October 23, a Tropical Cyclone Formation Alert (TCFA) was issued by the JTWC for an area of low pressure in the South China Sea. The low did not develop further and the TCFA was cancelled. On October 25, the low crossed the Malay Peninsula. Later that day, the system reorganized and another TCFA was issued at 1930 UTC, with advisories for Tropical Cyclone 05B initiated early the next morning. The storm tracked to the northwest and continued to intensify quickly; peaking as a 160 mph category five late on October 28. 11 hours after peaking, 05B weakened slightly to 155 mph and made landfall near the same area that 04B had only 11 days prior. The storm slowly weakened as it stalled just onshore in Odisha, India while dumping torrential rains. The storm reemerged into the Bay of Bengal on October 31 as a 45 mph tropical storm. 05B slowly weakened as it drifted southward. 05B weakened to a tropical depression on October 31, before dissipating on November 4.

It was seen to have annulare structure formation when it was intensifying and had category 3 equivalent wind and pressure. It retained that structure even when it reaches peak intensity just hours before landfall.

Damage from the cyclone was tremendous. Flooding from the storm's rain was described as being the worst in 100 years as well as the worst in India's post-independence history. The storm claimed the lives of at least 9,887 people and 406,000 livestock. Damages from the storm totaled to $4.44 billion (1999 USD).

=== Tropical Depression 31W ===
- Tropical depression (SSHWS)
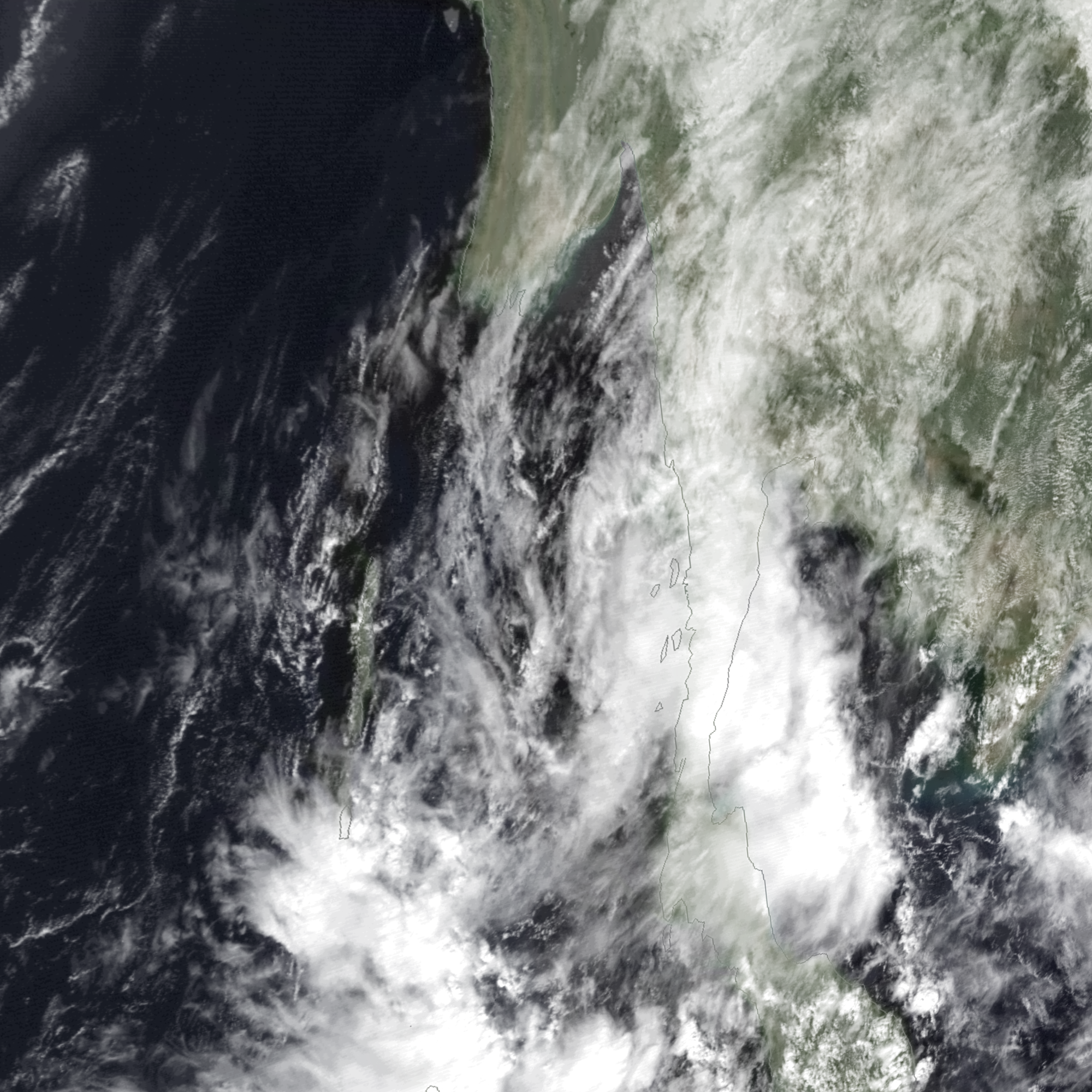
- Duration: December 5 (Entered basin) – December 5
- Peak intensity: 35 km/h (25 mph) (1-min);

The remnants of this storm from the Western Pacific basin entered the Andaman Sea on December 5 but redevelopment did not occur.

=== Depression BOB 07 ===
- Depression (IMD)
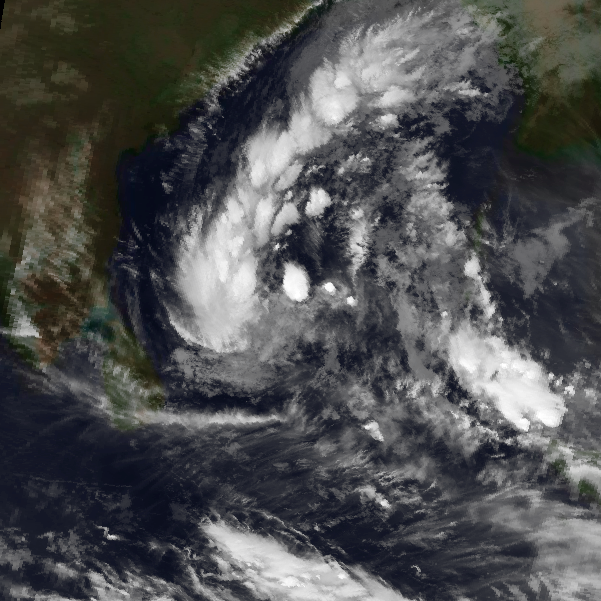
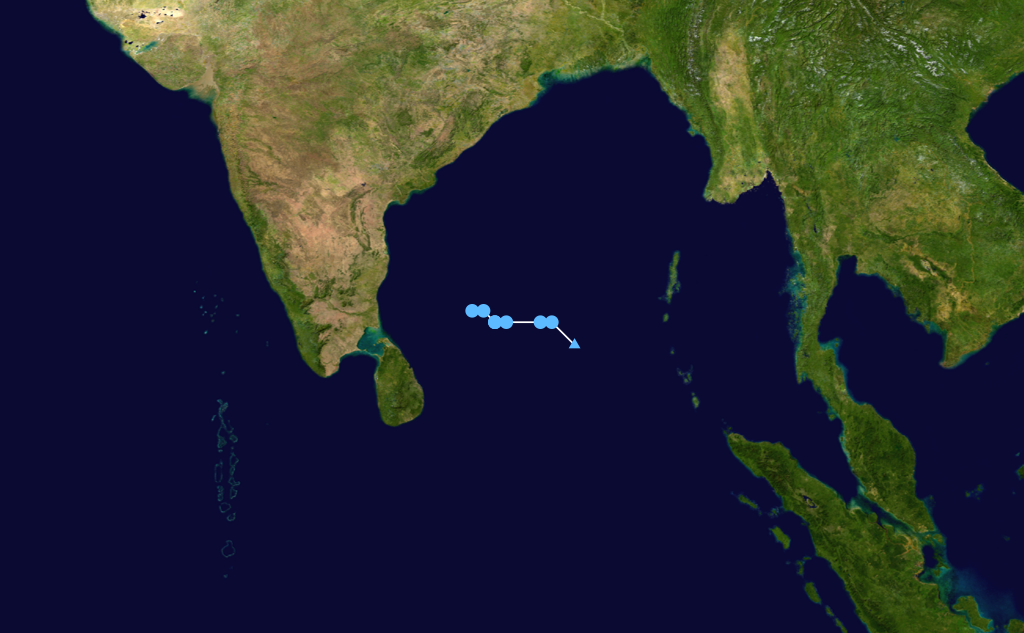
- Duration: December 8 – December 10
- Peak intensity: 45 km/h (30 mph) (3-min); 998 hPa (mbar)

A Tropical Depression formed in the Bay of Bengal on December 8. The depression was monitored by the IMD, not the JTWC. The depression remained out over open waters before dissipating on December 10.

== Season effects ==
Name	Dates	Peak intensity			Areas affected	Damage (USD)	Deaths	Ref(s).
Name	Dates	Category	Wind speed	Pressure	Areas affected	Damage (USD)	Deaths	Ref(s).
BOB 01	February 2 –5	Severe Cyclonic storm	95 km/h (60 mph)	998 hPa (29.47 inHg)	Sri Lanka	None	None	
ARB 01	May 16 –22	Extremely Severe Cyclonic storm	195 km/h (120 mph)	946 hPa (27.94 inHg)	India, Pakistan	$6 million	6,400	
03B	June 8 –11	Tropical Storm	65 km/h (40 mph)	997 hPa (29.12 inHg)	India	Unknown	Unknown	
BOB 02	June 17 –17	Deep depression	55 km/h (35 mph)	986 hPa (29.12 inHg)	India	Unknown	Unknown	
BOB 03	July 27 –28	Deep depression	55 km/h (35 mph)	990 hPa (29.23 inHg)	India	Unknown	Unknown	
BOB 04	August 6 –9	Depression	45 km/h (30 mph)	992 hPa (29.29 inHg)	India	Unknown	Unknown	
BOB 05	October 15 –19	Extremely Severe Cyclonic Storm	165 km/h (105 mph)	968 hPa (28.59 inHg)	India, Myanmar	$1 billion	198	
BOB 06	October 25 – November 3	Super Cyclonic Storm	260 km/h (160 mph)	912 hPa (26.93 inHg)	India, Thailand, Myanmar, Bangladesh	$4.44 billion	>9,887	
31W	December 5	Tropical Depression	35 km/h (25 mph)	Not specified	Myanmar, Thailand	None	None	
BOB 07	December 8 –10	Depression	45 km/h (30 mph)	998 hPa (29.47 inHg)	India, Sri Lanka	None	None	
Season aggregates
8 systems, 2 unofficial	February 2–December 10		260 km/h (160 mph)	912 hPa (26.93 inHg)		$5.446 billion	>16,485	

== See also ==
- List of North Indian Ocean cyclone seasons
- 1999 Atlantic hurricane season
- 1999 Pacific hurricane season
- 1999 Pacific typhoon season
- South-West Indian Ocean cyclone seasons: 1998–99, 1999–00
- Australian region cyclone seasons: 1998–99, 1999–00
- South Pacific cyclone seasons: 1998–99, 1999–00
