= Cyclone Gonu =

North Indian Ocean super cyclonic storm in 2007

Super Cyclonic Storm Gonu
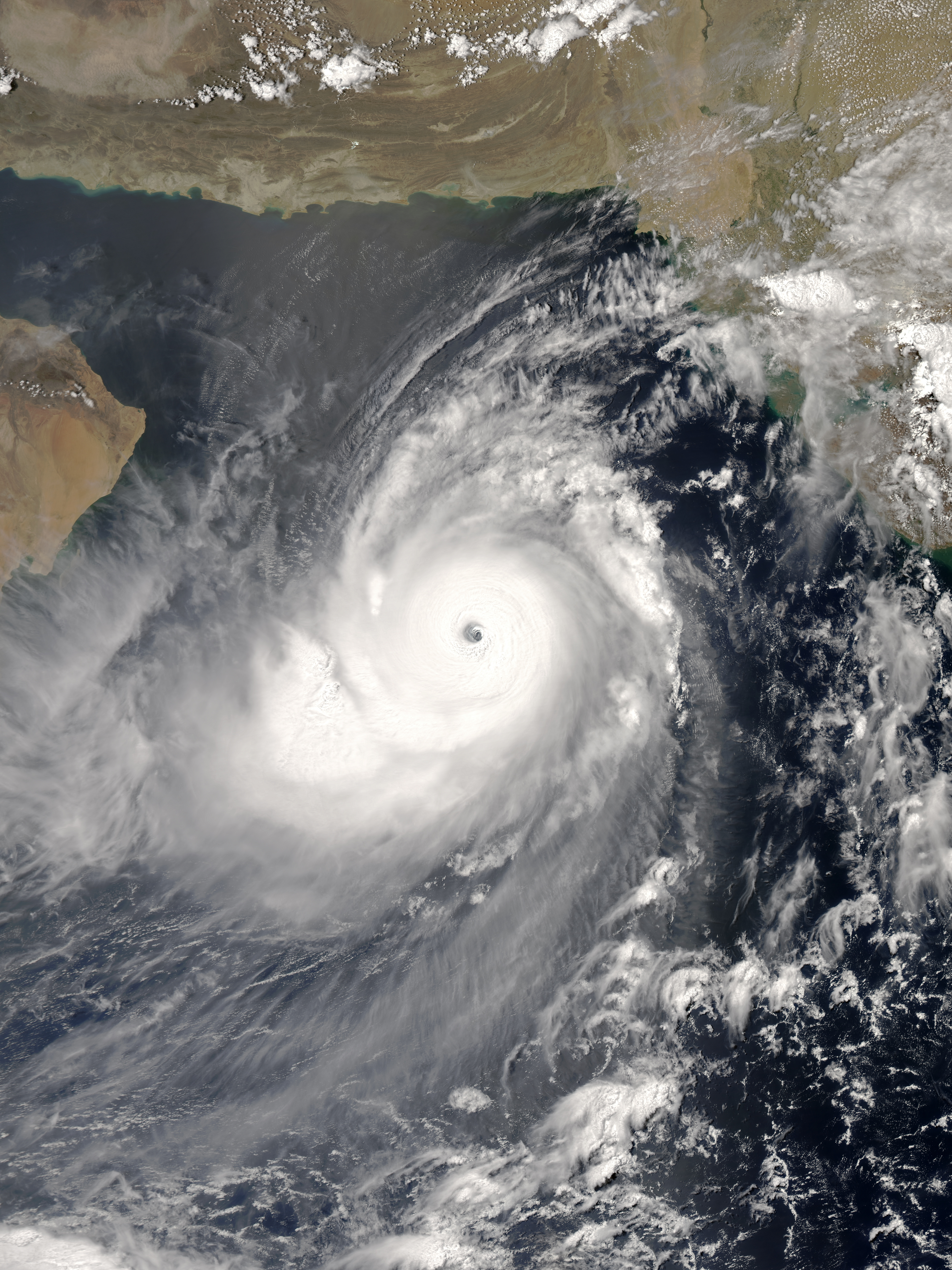
- Gonu near peak intensity on June 4

Meteorological history
- Formed: June 1, 2007
- Remnant low: June 7, 2007
- Dissipated: June 8, 2007

Super cyclonic storm
- 3-minute sustained (IMD)
- Highest winds: 240 km/h (150 mph)
- Lowest pressure: 920 hPa (mbar); 27.17 inHg (Record low in Arabian Sea)

Category 5-equivalent tropical cyclone
- 1-minute sustained (SSHWS/JTWC)
- Highest winds: 270 km/h (165 mph)
- Lowest pressure: 898 hPa (mbar); 26.52 inHg

Overall effects
- Fatalities: 78 total
- Missing: 37
- Damage: $4.42 billion (2007 USD)
- Areas affected: Western India; Oman; United Arab Emirates; Iran; Pakistan
- IBTrACS
- Part of the 2007 North Indian Ocean cyclone season

Super Cyclonic Storm Gonu (Note: The name Gonu (Dhivehi: ގޮނު; [go.nu]) was contributed by the Maldives and refers to the yellow boxfish (Ostracion cubicus) or woven bags made of palm leaves in Dhivehi.) was an extremely powerful tropical cyclone that became the strongest cyclone on record in the Arabian Sea. The second named tropical cyclone of the 2007 North Indian Ocean cyclone season, Gonu developed from a persistent area of convection in the eastern Arabian Sea on June 1, 2007. With a favorable upper-level environment and warm sea surface temperatures, it rapidly intensified to attain peak winds of 240 km/h (150 mph) on June 4, according to the India Meteorological Department. Gonu weakened after encountering dry air and cooler waters, and early on June 6, it made landfall on the easternmost tip of Oman, becoming the strongest tropical cyclone to hit the Arabian Peninsula. It then turned northward into the Gulf of Oman, and dissipated on June 7, after making landfall in southern Iran, the first cyclonic landfall in that country since 1898.

Intense tropical cyclones like Gonu are extremely rare in the Arabian Sea, and most storms in this area tend to be small and dissipate quickly. The cyclone caused 50 deaths and about $4.2 billion in damage (2007 USD) in Oman, where the cyclone was considered the nation's worst natural disaster. Gonu dropped heavy rainfall near the eastern coastline, reaching up to 610 mm (24 inches), which caused flooding and heavy damage. In Iran, the cyclone caused 28 deaths and $216 million in damage (2007 USD).

== Meteorological history ==
Map plotting the storm's track and intensity, according to the Saffir–Simpson scale Map key Saffir–Simpson scale Tropical depression (≤38 mph, ≤62 km/h) Tropical storm (39–73 mph, 63–118 km/h) Category 1 (74–95 mph, 119–153 km/h) Category 2 (96–110 mph, 154–177 km/h) Category 3 (111–129 mph, 178–208 km/h) Category 4 (130–156 mph, 209–251 km/h) Category 5 (≥157 mph, ≥252 km/h) Unknown Storm type Tropical cyclone Subtropical cyclone Extratropical cyclone, remnant low, tropical disturbance, or monsoon depression

Toward the end of May 2007, the monsoon trough spawned a low-pressure area in the eastern Arabian Sea. By May 31, an organized tropical disturbance was located about 645 km (400 mi) south of Mumbai, India, with cyclonic convection, or thunderstorm activity, and a well-defined mid-level circulation. The disturbance initially lacked a distinct low-level circulation; instead it consisted of strong divergence along the western end of a surface trough of low pressure. A favorable upper-level environment allowed convection to improve, and by late on June 1, the system developed to the extent that the India Meteorological Department (IMD) classified it as a depression. It tracked westward along the southwestern periphery of a mid-level ridge over southern India. Convection continued to organize, and early on June 2, the Joint Typhoon Warning Center (JTWC) classified the storm as Tropical Cyclone 02A, about 685 km (425 mi) southwest of Mumbai.

Upon first forming, the system contended with the entrainment of dry air to the northwest of the storm, which was expected to limit intensification. The storm steadily intensified, and early on June 2 the IMD upgraded it to deep depression status. Later in the day the IMD classified the system as Cyclonic Storm Gonu about 760 km (470 mi) southwest of Mumbai, India. As a mid-latitude trough developed over Pakistan, Gonu turned to the north and northeast, though it resumed a westward track after ridging built to the north of the storm. With a solid area of intense convection, it rapidly intensified to attain severe cyclonic status early on June 3, and with good outflow the JTWC upgraded it to the equivalent of a minimal hurricane. The dry air ultimately had a smaller impact on the intensification than previously estimated. A well-defined eye developed in the center of convection, and after moving over a local increase in ocean heat content, Gonu rapidly deepened.

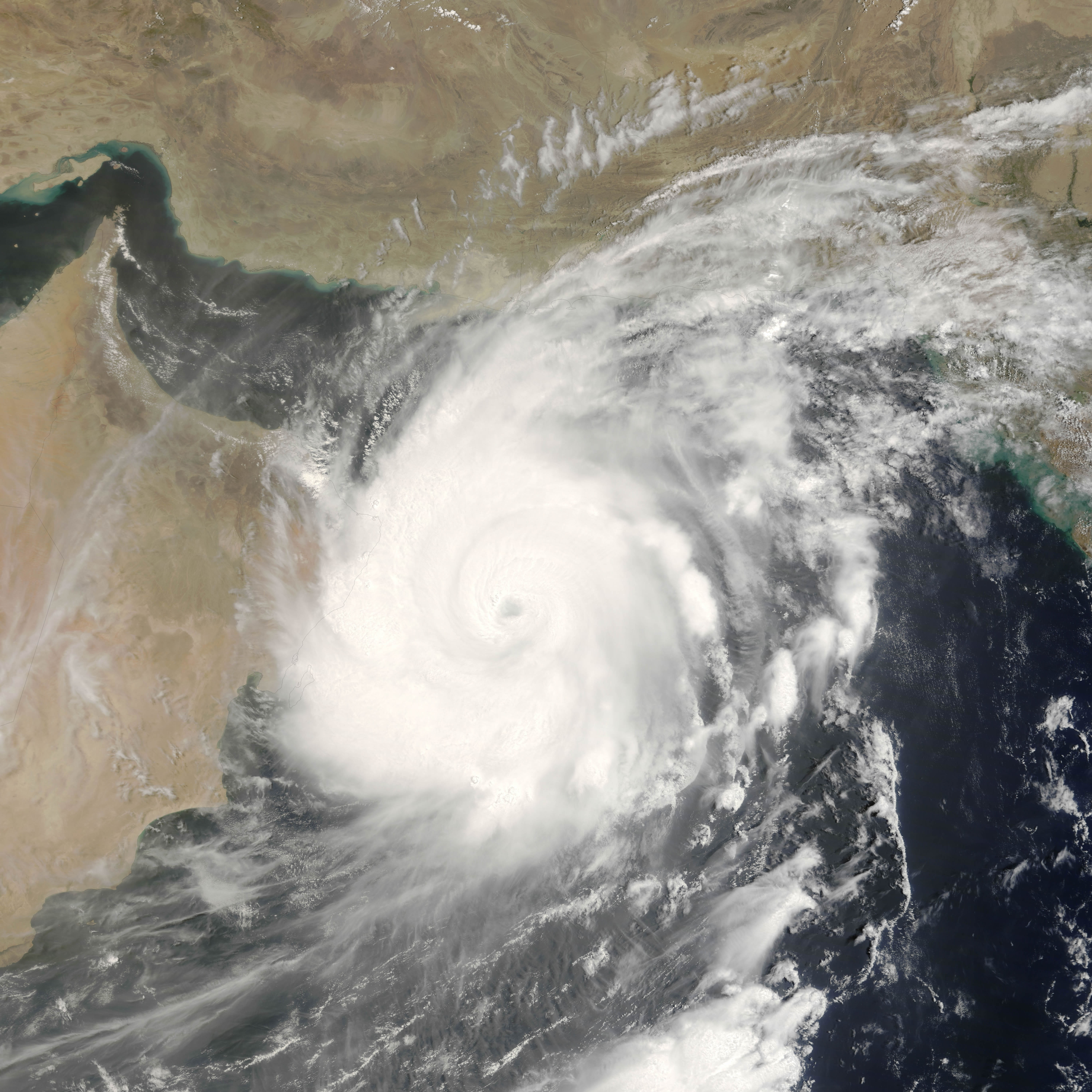
Cyclone Gonu off the coast of Oman on June 5

Late on June 3, the IMD upgraded the storm to Very Severe Cyclonic Storm Gonu. With warm waters, low amounts of vertical wind shear, and favorable upper-level outflow, Gonu strengthened further to attain peak 1-min sustained winds of 270 km/h (170 mph) and gusts to 315 km/h (195 mph), about 285 km (175 mi) east-southeast of Masirah Island on the coast of Oman. The IMD upgraded it to Super Cyclonic Storm Gonu late on June 4, with peak 3-min sustained winds reaching 240 km/h (150 mph) and an estimated pressure of 920 mbar. This made it the first super cyclonic storm in the Arabian Sea on record.

After the storm maintained peak winds for about six hours, the IMD downgraded Gonu to very severe cyclonic storm status late on June 4. Gonu's eye became cloud-filled and ragged, and the cyclone gradually weakened due to cooler water temperatures and drier air as it approached the Arabian Peninsula. Due to land interaction with Oman, the inner core of deep convection rapidly weakened, and over a period of 24 hours the intensity decreased by 95 km/h (60 mph). According to the IMD, Cyclone Gonu crossed the easternmost tip of Oman near Muscat early on June 6, with winds of 143 km/h (89 mph). Although the winds continued to gradually decrease, overall organization increased slightly in the hours prior to landfall; Gonu maintained a well-defined low-level structure with a weak eye.

After emerging into the Gulf of Oman, the cyclone briefly re-intensified slightly, possibly due to the warm waters. However, increasing wind shear and entrainment of dry air from the Arabian Peninsula continued to remove deep convection from its eastern semicircle. On June 6, the cyclone turned to the north-northwest, and later that day the JTWC downgraded Gonu to tropical storm status. The IMD followed suit by downgrading Gonu to severe cyclonic storm status, and later to cyclonic storm status early on June 7. Gonu crossed the Makran coast in Iran six hours later, and the IMD stopped issuing advisories on the cyclone. This made it the first tropical cyclone on record to hit the country since 1898. After landfall, Gonu persisted as a remnant low over Iran through June 8.

== Preparations ==
The Oman Chairman of the National Committee for Civil Defence, General Malek Bin Sulaiman Al Ma'amari, remarked the nation had already developed a contingency plan, which included the activation of army and police personnel after the storm's passage. Significant damage was expected, especially in northeastern areas, along with up to 150 mm (6 in) of rainfall and very strong winds. Officials recommended citizens evacuate from potentially affected areas, and about 7,000 people were forced to leave Masirah Island due to the threat of high surf and strong winds. Overall, more than 20,000 people evacuated to emergency shelters. A state of emergency was declared for the nation. The Omani national weather service warned that the cyclone was expected to be worse than the destructive cyclone that hit Masirah Island in 1977. The Mina al Fahal oil terminal closed for over three days due to the threat of the storm. Omani officials closed government offices for two days and declared a five-day-long national holiday. Most businesses near the coastline were closed prior to the announcement. The nation's Civil Aviation Authority, along with Muscat International Airport (then named as "Seeb International Airport") and Salalah International Airport canceled all flights at 20:00 UTC on June 5.

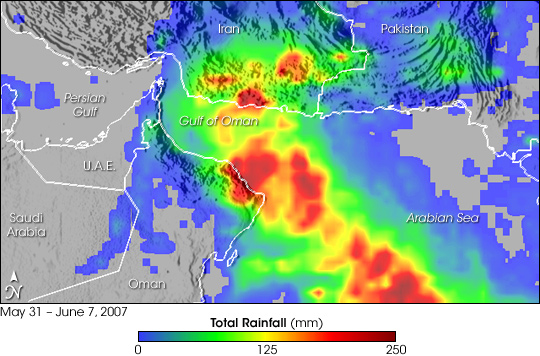
Map showing rainfall totals around the Gulf of Oman between May 31 and June 7, 2007. The red areas show where rainfall exceeded 200 mm (8 inches).

In Saudi Arabia and the United Arab Emirates, both members of OPEC, no official warnings had been issued due to Gonu. The storm was not expected to disrupt oil supplies from these two nations. However, oil prices rose early on June 5 because of concerns of disruptions caused by Gonu, as well as the threat of nationwide strikes in Nigeria, Africa's biggest oil producer. Crude oil for July delivery rose $1.13, or 1.7 percent, to $66.21 Monday on the New York Mercantile Exchange, the highest close in 15 days. Futures reached $66.48, the highest intraday price since April 30. The contract was at $65.95 a barrel, down 26 cents, in after-hours electronic trading at 9:43 a.m. Tuesday in Singapore. Tom Kloza, chief oil analyst at the Oil Price Information Service, said he doubted the increase could be attributed to Gonu. "I don't know if you can really attribute any of the gain to the cyclone", he said. "It's an excuse, as opposed to a reason, for the rise in prices."

In Pakistan, officials recommended fishermen remain within 50 km (30 mi) of the coastline, due to anticipated rough waves in the open ocean. Naval authorities in the United States warned ships to avoid the cyclone in the Arabian Sea.

The Iran Department of Meteorology declared storm warnings for the country's southeastern coastline; the agency anticipated moderate to severe precipitation and gusty winds. Prior to the arrival of the cyclone, about 40,000 people, including around 4,000 students at the International University of Chabahar, evacuated coastal areas of the country to at least 1 km (0.6 mi) inland. All flights in and out of the Konarak Airport were canceled during a 48-hour period. Additionally, all hospitals in Sistan and Baluchestan Province were put on red alert. The Iran chapter of the Red Cross advanced the delivery of necessary relief supplies.

== Impact ==
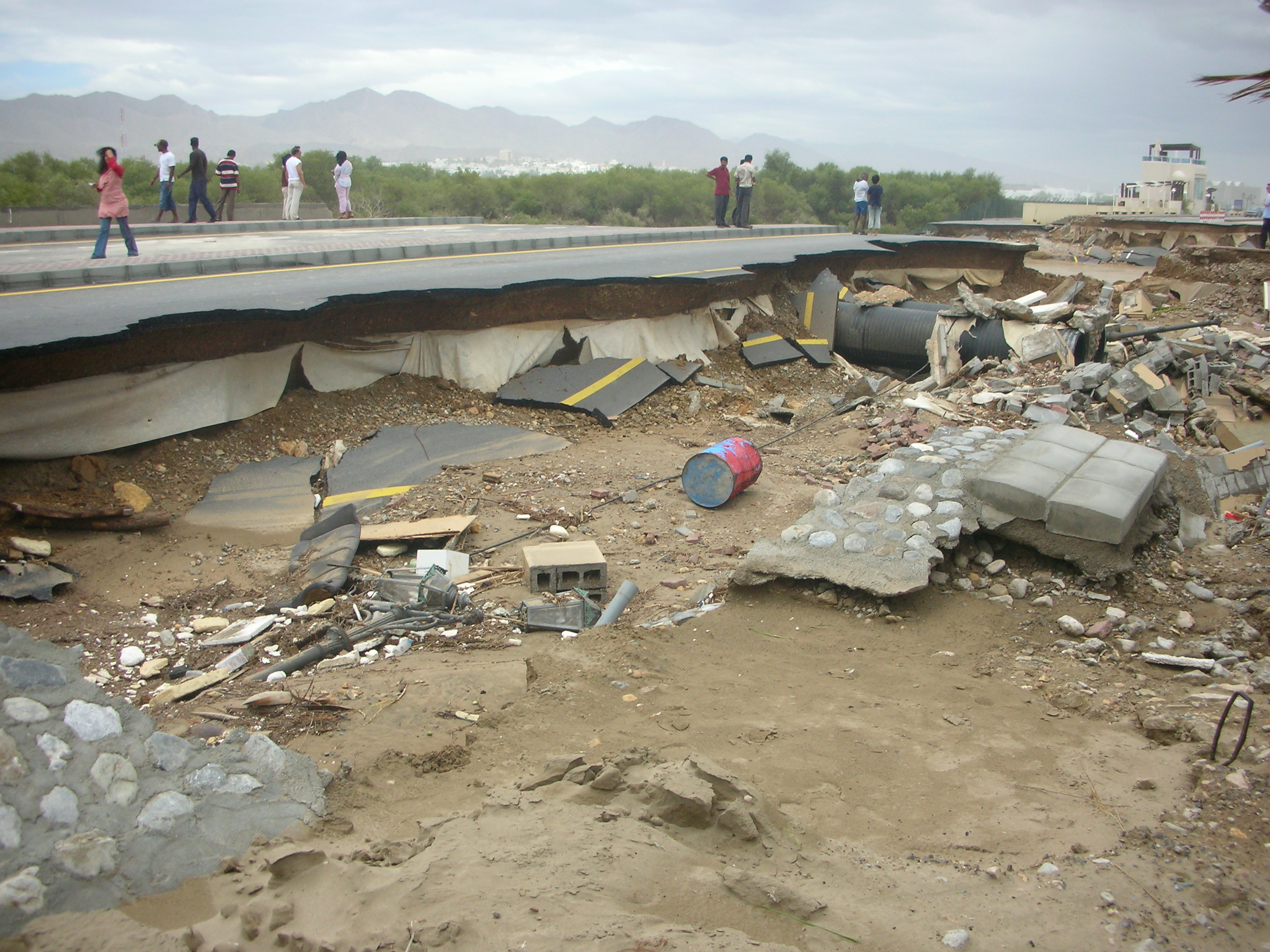
Road damage in Muscat, Oman

Across its path, Cyclone Gonu caused heavy damage and many fatalities. About seven hours before passing near the northeastern Oman coastline, Gonu began affecting the country with rough winds and heavy precipitation; rainfall totals reached 610 mm (24 in) near the coast. Gonu produced strong waves along much of the coastline, leaving many coastal roads flooded. There was a 5.1 meter (17 foot) storm surge and a 200 m (660 ft) incursion of seawater inland at Ras al-Hadd; other areas along the coast had similar levels.

=== Oman ===
Strong winds knocked out power and telephone lines across the eastern region of the country, leaving thousands isolated until the lines were repaired hours later. The cyclone caused extensive damage along the coastline, including in the city of Sur and the village of Ras al Hadd at the easternmost point of the Omani mainland. In Muscat, winds reached 100 km/h (60 mph), leaving most of the capital city without power. Strong waves and heavy rainfall flooded streets and some buildings. Police workers in the city sent text messages to keep people away from flooded streets to prevent electrocutions. Little damage was reported to the oil fields of the nation. The liquefied natural gas terminal in Sur, which handles 10 million tonnes of gas each year, was badly hit by the storm and could not be operated. Overall, the cyclone killed 50 people in the country; by the fourth day after it struck the country, 27 people had been reported missing. Around 20,000 people were affected, and damage in the country was estimated at $4.2 billion (2007 USD).

=== United Arab Emirates ===
Costliest known North Indian cyclones (adjusted for inflation)
Rank	Cyclone	Season	Damage (2025 USD)
1	ESCS Nargis	2008	$22.9 billion
2	CS Senyar	2025	$20.1 billion
3	SuCS Amphan	2020	$19.3 billion
4	ESCS Hudhud	2014	$15 billion
5	ESCS Fani	2019	$10.2 billion
6	SuCS BOB 06	1999	$8.58 billion
7	SuCS Gonu	2007	$6.86 billion
8	ESCS ARB 02	1998	$5.93 billion
9	ESCS Phailin	2013	$5.89 billion
10	VSCS Vardah	2016	$4.53 billion

Fierce waves pushed large amounts of water to coastal areas in Fujairah of the United Arab Emirates, forcing roads to be closed and traffic diverted. Civil defence and police were on duty to manage the road closures, while municipal workers pumped the excess water off the roads. The road connecting Kalba and Fujairah was closed due to the road being submerged by water. The waves along the coastline were reported to be 10 m (32 ft) high, which destroyed about a dozen fishing boats. About 300 boats were moved from the water or emptied of equipment, and overall damage to the port of Fujairah was reported as severe. A boat sank by the port, leaving its ten passengers missing.

=== Iran ===
Upon striking Iran, Gonu dropped moderate to heavy rainfall, including 74 mm (2.91 in) in the city of Chabahar. Winds reached 111 km/h (69 mph), which caused power outages and damaged some homes made of clay; the power outage led to some fires across the city. The rainfall flooded at least 40 houses, and resulted in the temporary closure of several major roads. Gonu produced a storm tide of 2 m (6.5 ft) in some locations, with many homes near the coastline receiving damage. In Jask, heavy rainfall overflowed a river, killing three people in a vehicle caught in the water. Flooding from the rainfall also destroyed a dam in Nikshahr County. Throughout the country, the cyclone caused 28 deaths, including 20 from drowning; damage in Iran was estimated at 2 billion (2007 IRR, $216 million 2007 USD).

=== Pakistan ===
Gonu caused strong gusty winds and torrential rainfall along Pakistan's Arabian Sea coast from Karachi to Gwadar. The cyclone was reported to have sunk a number of boats off the eastern coast of Gwadar. It was feared that fishing launches that had ventured into the open sea may have been stranded. At least three houses and one school were destroyed and 210 anchored fishing boats were badly damaged anchored in the coastal town of Sar Bandar in Baluchistan province

== Aftermath ==
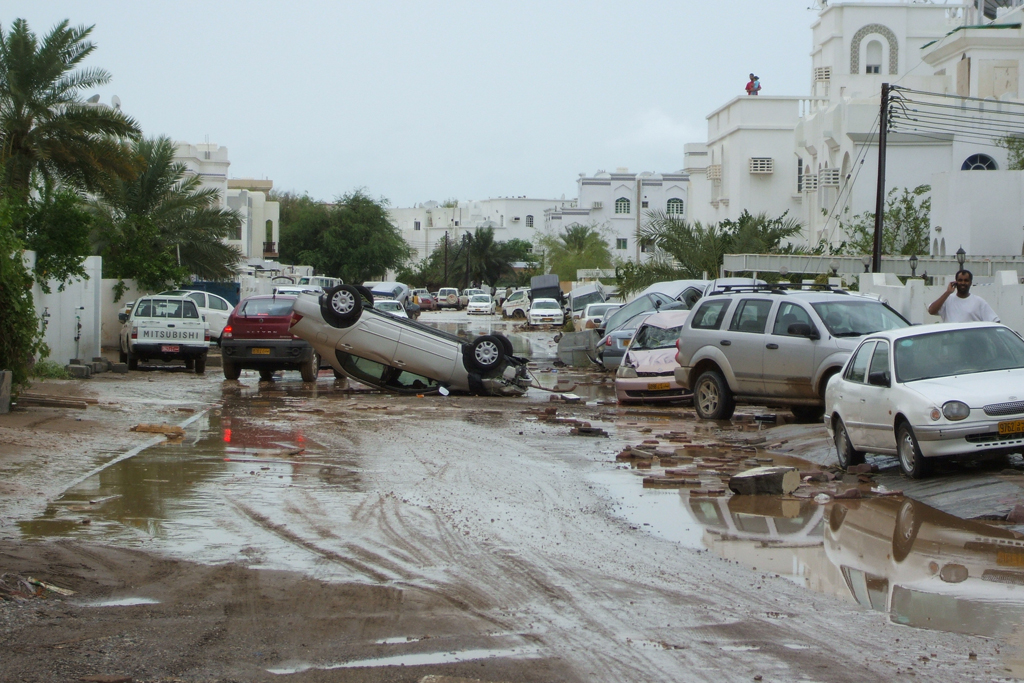
Flipped car and flooding on a street in Muscat, Oman

Satellite animation showing the life cycle of Gonu

Flights to and from Muscat resumed after three days while Fujairah reopened on June 7 after it was closed the day before. The cyclone caused little impact to oil facilities along its path; after the initial price rises, oil dropped over US$2 per barrel as a result. Across the northern Arabian Sea, the passage of Gonu produced stronger winds and significant upwelling – an oceanographic phenomenon that involves the replacement of the nutrient-depleted surface water with deeper nutrient-rich water; the passage caused a significant increase in phytoplankton. Additionally, the cyclone delayed the arrival of the Indian Ocean south-west monsoon in the Western Ghats in India.

In Oman, production of desalinated water was interrupted, as both of Oman's desalination plants failed. The first, Ghubrah, lost supplies of natural gas, halting production; while the second, Barka, sustained a damaged switchgear due to flooding. These plants provided water to Muscat's 631,000 residents and surrounding areas, triggering severe water shortages across eastern Oman. To rectify the situation, officials used water tanks. The water returned to near normal in five days, as the two plants returned to service. Additionally, electricians worked quickly to repair the power outages across the region. Five days after Gonu hit, utilities were restored to most of Muscat and the coastal provinces. The Omani army assisted residents in returning to their houses. Even though the Omani government did not request any international aid, the United States offered assistance through naval ships in the area; this was eventually rejected. The country lost an estimated $200 million (2007 USD) in oil exports. In the months after the storm, the government allocated funds for the removal of debris and trees, as well as restoration of roads in tourist areas. Additionally, the National Committee for Civil Defence set up 139 buildings to provide temporary housing for 8,192 people. Services such as water and electricity were gradually restored, and people returned to their homes. By two weeks after the storm's passage, most of those remaining in shelters were from Qurayat, one of the most severely affected villages.

After the passage of the cyclone, the Iran chapter of the Red Cross and its volunteers worked in conjunction with the military to distribute relief supplies to villages using trucks and helicopters. The branch in Sistan and Baluchestan Province distributed over 10,000 blankets, 1,300 tents, 400 clothing items, 82,000 loaves of bread, and 87,000 bottles of water to affected citizens. In total, 61,558 families received aid from the Red Cross in Iran. The Iranian government provided monetary relief to the affected people. Officials worked to restore roads, bridges, and power systems in the affected areas, although repairs were more difficult in some locations; by a week after the storm, several villages remained surrounded by floodwaters.

== Records ==
Cyclone Gonu set several intensity records. When it became a very severe cyclonic storm on June 3, Gonu became the strongest tropical cyclone on record in the Arabian Sea. It was the only super cyclonic storm, which is a tropical cyclone with 3-minute sustained winds of at least 220 km/h (135 mph), in the region, until Cyclone Kyarr 12 years later. The JTWC estimated peak 1-minute sustained winds of 270 km/h (170 mph), the highest 1-minute sustained winds of any cyclone in the North Indian Ocean until Cyclone Fani 12 years later. With a damage total of $4.2 billion (2007 USD) and 50 deaths, Gonu became the worst natural disaster on record in Oman. Additionally, the storm was only the second cyclonic storm on record to strike Iran, with the other one doing so on June 4, 1898.

== See also ==
- Tropical cyclones in 2007
- List of the most intense tropical cyclones
- Timeline of the 2007 North Indian Ocean cyclone season
- List of Arabian Peninsula tropical cyclones
- 1970 Bhola cyclone – Deadliest tropical cyclone recorded worldwide
- 1999 Odisha cyclone – Most intense storm in the North Indian Ocean
- Cyclone Phet (2010)
- Cyclone Chapala (2015)
- Cyclone Megh (2015)
- Cyclone Kyarr (2019) – The first ever Super Cyclonic Storm since 2007
- Cyclone Amphan (2020) – One of the most intense tropical cyclones ever recorded in the basin
