= Church's Auxiliary for Social Action =

- Type: Charity
- Industry: NGO
- Founded: 1947, India
- Headquarters: Registered office: New Delhi; Zonal offices: Chennai, Kolkata, Mumbai, Sector offices: Guwahati, Imphal, Aizawl, Dimapur, Shillong, Bhubaneshwar, Ranchi, Lucknow, Indore, Raipur, Udaipur, Nagapattinam, Cuddalore, Tirunelveli, Alapuzha, Bapatla, Port Blair and Shimla
- Key people: Busi Suneel Bhanu (Chairperson), Sushant Agarwal (Director)
- Number of employees: 500

Church's Auxiliary for Social Action or CASA (founded in 1947) is a non-religious Indian development organisation and charitable trust based in New Delhi and a service wing of the National Council of Churches in India comprising the Orthodox and Protestant Church Societies in India. CASA is a member of ACT Alliance

Mar Aprem Mooken writes,

Jawaharlal Nehru, the Prime Minister of India at the time of partition, asked the Christian community to assist in the work among the refugees, which the community readily responded through the National Council of Churches in India.

== Genesis ==
The partition of India played a virtual havoc with peoples lives which Jawaharlal Nehru, then Prime Minister of India wanted to address and shared it with J. Waskom Pickett and Marshall Russell Reed who involved the National Council of Churches in India (NCCI) to lend a hand in mitigating the suffering of the displaced people for which the NCCI formed an ad hoc Relief Committee. Over the years', the Relief Committee took different names,

- 1947, Refugee and Famine Relief Committee or Central Relief Committee,
- 1955, Committee on Relief and Gift Supplies (CORAGS),
- Christian Agency for Social Action,
- (present) Church's Auxiliary for Social Action.

== Funding ==
As a development non-religious organisation the activities of CASA are funded through the individuals, the Churches in India, the State, the corporates and a few overseas ecumenical bodies.

List of Directorships

(Period, Name of the Director )

- 1947-1947 - Dr. E. C. Bhatty
- 1947-1948 - Dr. E. D. Lucas
- 1949-1951 - Dr. Donald Ebright
- 1952-1956 - Dr. Donald Rugh
- 1956-1957 - Mr. Ranjit Chetsingh
- 1957-1958 - Rev. Edward Benedict
- 1958-1961 - Mr. J. S. S. Malelu
- 1962-1966 - Capt. Alexander Jethro
- 1966-1971 - Mr. Stephen Mathai
- 1971-1971 - Mr. Idrak Bhatty
- 1971-1972 - Mr. H. B. Kadambavanam
- 1972-1974 - Mr. S. Ponraj
- 1974-1975 - Mr. T. S. Francis
- 1975-1977 - Mr. P. C. Joseph
- 1977-2001 - Maj. J. K. Michael
- 2001-Present - Dr. Sushant Agrawal

== Programmatic interventions ==
CASA's approach to development could be put in the following way, The Cross Cutting Thematic Areas of CASA’s programmatic interventions are : 1. Humanitarian Aid 2. Development Initiatives to address Structural Poverty 3. Gender Mainstreaming 4. Climate Change 5. Local Capacities for Peace and 'Do No Harm'
