= Sorabji Pochkhanawala =

Indian businessman (1881–1937)

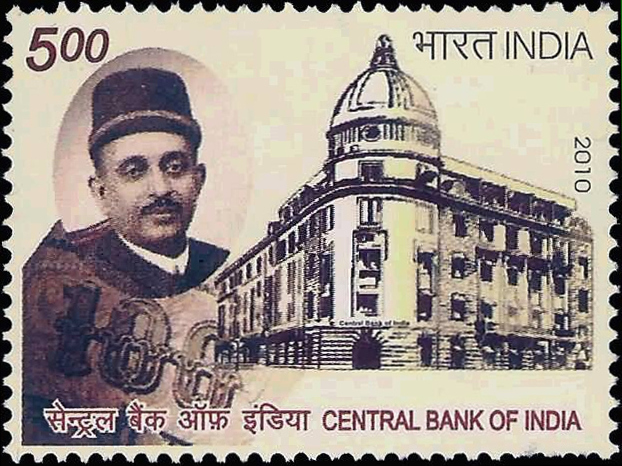
A 2010 stamp dedicated to Pochkhanawala and the Central Bank of India

Sir Sorab Nusserwanji Pochkhanawala (9 August 1881 – 4 July 1937) usually referred to with the honorific as Sir Sorabji was a Parsi Indian banker and the principal founders of the Central Bank of India.

== Early life ==
Sorabji Pochkhanawala was born in Bombay (Mumbai) to Nasserwanji Pochkhanawala and Bai Gulbai. His father died when Sorabji was six, leaving the family in poverty as most of their savings had been lost in a bank failure. The eldest son, Hirjibhoy, a clerk in the Chartered Bank of India, Australia and China, assumed responsibility for the family and raised Sorabji, his brother Edulji and their sister. After matriculating from Bombay University in 1897 at the age of 16, Pochkhanawala entered St. Stephen's College to begin his BA studies, but left after failing his first examinations.

With his brother's help, he found a job in the Chartered Bank as a clerk, earning a salary of Rs. 20 per month. He also took a book-keeping course and subsequently passed the book-keeping examinations for the London Chamber of Commerce. One day, while reading a copy of the Journal of the Institute of Bankers, London, he elected to study for the institute's examinations and qualify as a professional banker. Though he passed the first set of examinations on his first attempt, he was disillusioned by the racism he encountered in the process. Ultimately, though, he succeeded in becoming the first Indian Certificated Associate of the institute.

After seven years at the Chartered Bank, Pochkhanawala resigned in 1905. He then joined the newly established Bank of India, established by several Indian merchants, as an accountant. By this time, he had come to understand how the British dominated banking in India, which led him to envision a purely Indian-controlled bank, by which Indians could exercise dominance over their financial affairs.

In 1910, he married Bai Sakarbai Ruttonji; the couple had two sons and three daughters.

== Central Bank of India ==
With a business acquaintance, Kalianji Vardhaman Jetsey, who provided initial financial support, Pochkhanawala began to look for prominent Indians who would support his vision of an Indian bank by and for Indians. After successfully locating premises, they managed to form a board of directors after much difficulty. This first board consisted of prominent merchants in the Hindu, Muslim and Parsi business communities. The prominent Parsi barrister Sir Pherozeshah Mehta was then invited to become chairman of the venture, and accepted. On 11 December 1911, the Central Bank of India commenced business with a capital of 50 lakhs rupees, divided into 50-rupee shares. 40,000 shares were issued and soon subscribed. Within its first week of official existence, over 70 accounts totaling 1.5 lakh rupees were opened.

Pochkhanawala served as manager of the Central Bank from its establishment until 1920, subsequently becoming its managing director. He was named a member of the Government Securities Rehabilitation Committee the following year.

Regarding his vision of founding the first Swadeshi Bank in India, Pochkhanawala said:

The benefits of a good bank are not restricted to the four walls of its banking & a legendary Banker hall, nor are they limited by the frontiers of its banking business; they transcend far into the realms of commerce and industry and every other branch of economic activity. The value of "national banking" in the promotion of national good is obvious and undeniable.

== Knighthood and later life ==
Pochkhanawala was knighted in the 1934 King's Birthday Honours list for his services to banking in India, and formally invested with his knighthood at Viceroy's House (now Rashtrapati Bhavan) on 1 March 1935 by the Viceroy, the Marquess of Willingdon. In 1934, he accepted the Government of Ceylon's invitation to become Chairman of the Ceylon Banking Enquiry Commission.

He died on 4 July 1937 after an illness, aged 55.
