= Tropical Storm Pabuk (2019) =

Pacific tropical storm and North Indian cyclone in 2019

Tropical Storm Pabuk Cyclonic Storm Pabuk
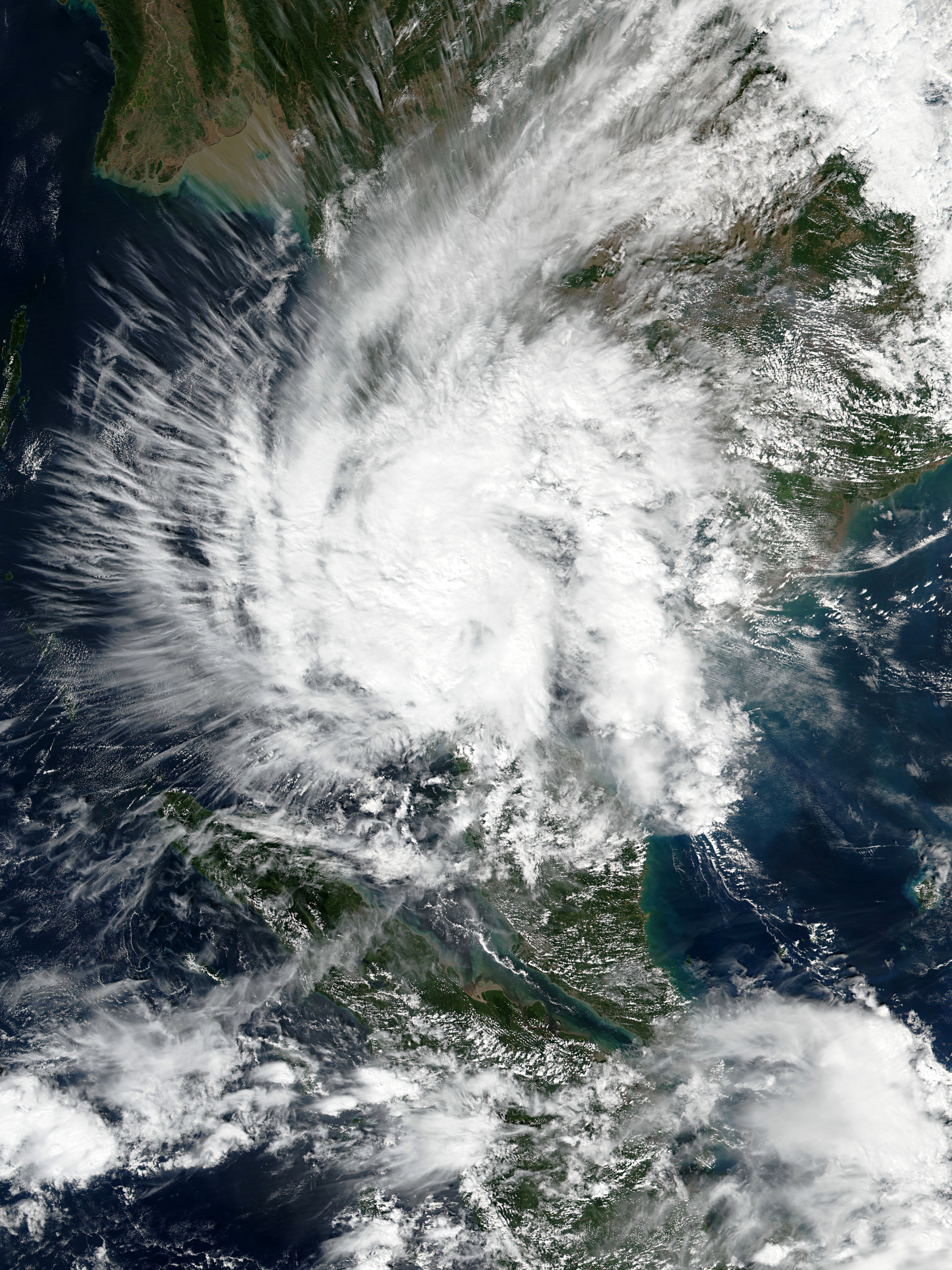
- Pabuk at peak intensity and making landfall in southern Thailand on January 4

Meteorological history
- Formed: December 31, 2018
- Dissipated: January 8, 2019

Tropical storm
- 10-minute sustained (JMA)
- Highest winds: 85 km/h (50 mph)
- Lowest pressure: 994 hPa (mbar); 29.35 inHg

Cyclonic storm
- 3-minute sustained (IMD)
- Highest winds: 85 km/h (50 mph)
- Lowest pressure: 998 hPa (mbar); 29.47 inHg

Tropical storm
- 1-minute sustained (SSHWS/JTWC)
- Highest winds: 95 km/h (60 mph)
- Lowest pressure: 996 hPa (mbar); 29.41 inHg

Overall effects
- Fatalities: 10 total
- Damage: $95.1 million (2019 USD)
- Areas affected: Natuna Islands, Vietnam, Malay Peninsula, Myanmar, Thailand, Andaman Islands
- IBTrACS
- Part of the 2019 Pacific typhoon and North Indian Ocean cyclone seasons

Tropical Storm Pabuk, (Note: The name Pabuk (Lao: ປາບຶກ, [paː˩ bɯk̚˧˥]) was contributed by Laos and refers to the Mekong giant catfish (Pangasianodon gigas) in Lao.) also referred to as Cyclonic Storm Pabuk, was a weak storm that struck the Malay Peninsula in early January 2019. It was also the earliest-forming storm in both the Northwestern Pacific Ocean and North Indian Ocean basins on record. Forming on the last day of 2018, Pabuk persisted into 2019, spanning two calendar years, and crossed into the North Indian Ocean basin several days later. The first tropical cyclone and named storm of the 2019 Pacific typhoon and North Indian Ocean cyclone seasons, Pabuk originated as a tropical disturbance in the South China Sea on December 28, 2018, which organized into a tropical depression on December 31. A day later, on January 1, 2019, the system intensified into a tropical storm and was named Pabuk. Pabuk made landfall in Thailand on January 4, emerging into the Bay of Bengal in the North Indian Ocean basin shortly afterward. Pabuk weakened after it entered the North Indian Ocean, eventually degenerating into a remnant low on January 7, before dissipating on the next day.

Pabuk killed a total of 10 people, and the storm caused an estimated total of US$95 million in damage. In Thailand, eight people were killed and the economic losses were estimated at $93.8 million. Pabuk also caused one death each in Vietnam and Malaysia.

== Meteorological history ==
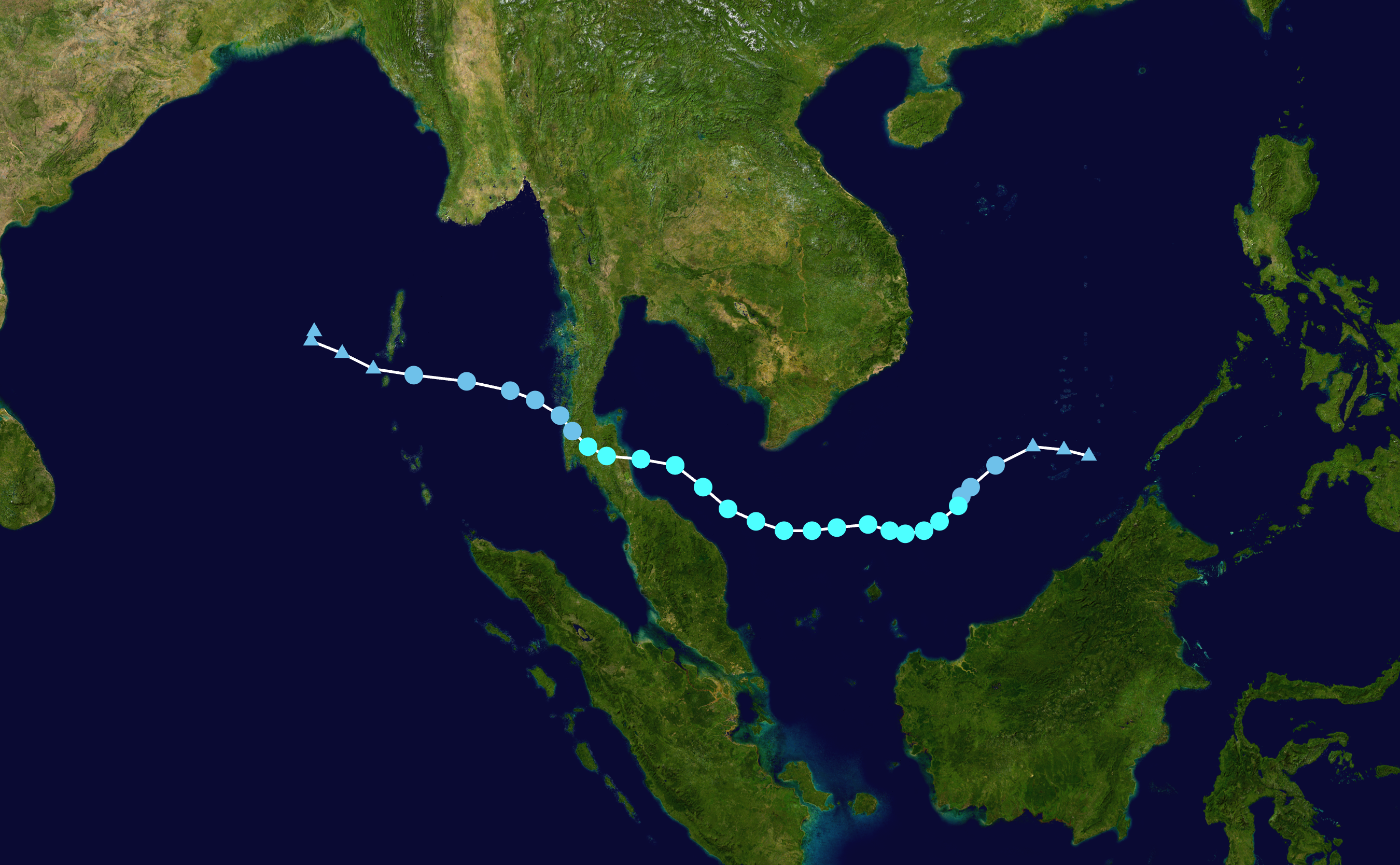
Map plotting the storm's track and intensity, according to the Saffir–Simpson scale Map key Saffir–Simpson scale Tropical depression (≤38 mph, ≤62 km/h) Tropical storm (39–73 mph, 63–118 km/h) Category 1 (74–95 mph, 119–153 km/h) Category 2 (96–110 mph, 154–177 km/h) Category 3 (111–129 mph, 178–208 km/h) Category 4 (130–156 mph, 209–251 km/h) Category 5 (≥157 mph, ≥252 km/h) Unknown Storm type Tropical cyclone Subtropical cyclone Extratropical cyclone, remnant low, tropical disturbance, or monsoon depression

A tropical disturbance formed over the southern portion of the South China Sea on December 28, 2018, absorbing the remnants of Tropical Depression 35W (Usman) on December 30. Under high vertical wind shear, the low-pressure area remained disorganized until December 31 when it was upgraded to a tropical depression by both the JMA and the JTWC. As it was designated 36W by the JTWC, it was unofficially the last system of the 2018 typhoon season. At around 06:00 UTC on January 1, 2019, the system was upgraded to the first tropical storm of the 2019 typhoon season and was named Pabuk by the JMA, surpassing Typhoon Alice in 1979 to become the earliest-forming tropical storm in the northwest Pacific Ocean on record. At that time, Pabuk was about 650 km (405 miles) southeast of Ho Chi Minh City, Vietnam and drifted westward slowly with a partially exposed low-level circulation center.

Under marginal conditions, including warm sea surface temperatures, excellent poleward outflow but strong vertical wind shear, Pabuk struggled to intensify further for another two days until it accelerated west-northwestward and entered the Gulf of Thailand on January 3, where vertical wind shear was slightly weaker. This made Pabuk the first tropical storm to exist in the gulf since Muifa in 2004. Around that time, the storm tried to form an eye, which was revealed by microwave imagery. On January 4, the Thai Meteorological Department reported that Pabuk had made landfall over Pak Phanang, Nakhon Si Thammarat at 12:45 ICT (05:45 UTC), although other agencies indicated a landfall at peak intensity between 06:00 and 12:00 UTC. Pabuk became the first tropical storm to make landfall over southern Thailand since Linda in 1997. Shortly after 12:00 UTC, the JMA issued its last full advisory for Pabuk, as the storm exited the basin into the North Indian Ocean.

Soon after Pabuk crossed over into the basin, the IMD initiated advisories on the storm, making Pabuk the earliest-forming cyclonic storm for this basin, surpassing Hibaru in 2005, as well as the first cyclonic storm with a name originally assigned by RSMC Tokyo. Over the next few days, Pabuk continued moved west-northwestward, before weakening into a well-marked low on January 7. The system's remnant low then turned to the northeast, subsequently dissipating on January 8.

== Impact ==
Satellite loop from NASA's EOSDIS Worldview, displaying Pabuk's lifespan

In Vietnam, Pabuk resulted in the death of one person. The storm also caused an estimated ₫29 billion (US$1.26 million) in damage in the country. Elsewhere, many people were forced to evacuate coastal areas of Thailand. In Bangkok, rain and storm surge flooded roads in the large city, and there was reports of major wind damage by nightfall, with many trees downed. Pabuk killed 8 people in Thailand, including one Russian tourist; 3 of the victims were killed by flying debris and the storm surge. Pabuk's damage in Thailand were counted to be 3 billion bahts (US$93.8 million). Pabuk killed one person by drowning in Malaysia.

== See also ==
- Weather of 2018 and 2019
- Tropical cyclones in 2019
- Other tropical cyclones named Pabuk
- Typhoon Gay (1989)
- Cyclone Forrest (1992)
- Tropical Storm Linda (1997)
- Tropical Storm Vamei (2001)
- Typhoon Durian (2006)
- Cyclone Jal (2010)
- Tropical Depressions Wilma and BOB 05 (2013)
- Tropical Storm Matmo and Cyclone Bulbul (2019)
