= Cyclone Kyarr =

North Indian cyclone in 2019

Super Cyclonic Storm Kyarr
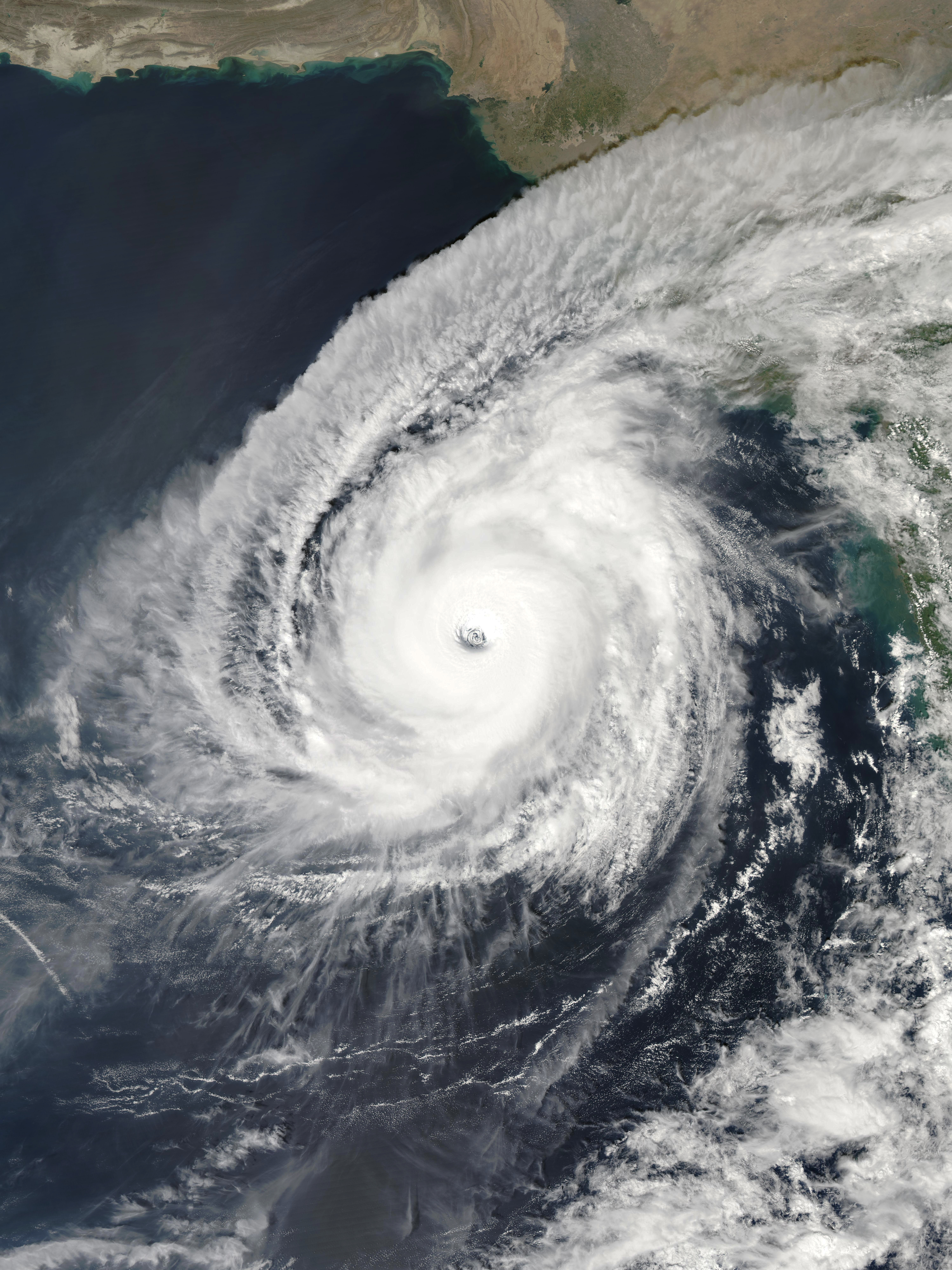
- Kyarr near peak intensity on October 27

Meteorological history
- Formed: 24 October 2019
- Remnant low: 1 November 2019
- Dissipated: 3 November 2019

Super cyclonic storm
- 3-minute sustained (IMD)
- Highest winds: 240 km/h (150 mph)
- Lowest pressure: 922 hPa (mbar); 27.23 inHg

Category 4-equivalent tropical cyclone
- 1-minute sustained (SSHWS/JTWC)
- Highest winds: 250 km/h (155 mph)
- Lowest pressure: 924 hPa (mbar); 27.29 inHg

Overall effects
- Fatalities: 5 indirect
- Damage: Minimal
- Areas affected: Western India, Oman, United Arab Emirates, Socotra, Somalia
- IBTrACS
- Part of the 2019 North Indian Ocean cyclone season

Super Cyclonic Storm Kyarr (Note: The name Kyarr (Burmese: ကျား, [t͡ɕá]) was contributed by Myanmar and means "tiger" in Burmese.) was an extremely powerful tropical cyclone that became the first super cyclonic storm in the North Indian Ocean since Gonu in 2007 in October 2019. It was also the second strongest tropical cyclone in the Arabian Sea and one of the most intense tropical cyclones in North Indian Ocean history. The seventh depression, fifth named cyclone, and the first, and only Super Cyclonic Storm of the annual season, Kyarr developed from a low-pressure system near the Equator. The system organized itself and intensified to a tropical storm on October 24, 2019, as it moved eastwards. The storm underwent rapid intensification and reached Super Cyclonic Storm status on October 27, as it turned westward. On that same day, Kyarr peaked as a Super Cyclonic Storm, with maximum 3-minute sustained winds of 240 km/h (150 mph), maximum 1-minute sustained winds of 250 km/h (155 mph), and a minimum central pressure of 922 millibars (27.2 inHg), making the system a high-end Category 4-equivalent tropical cyclone. Afterward, Kyarr gradually began to weaken, while curving westward, and then turning to the southwest. On October 31, Kyarr weakened into a Deep Depression, before turning southward on November 2, passing just to the west of Socotra. Kyarr degenerated into a remnant low later that day, before dissipating on November 3, just off the coast of Somalia.

Despite the immense strength of the storm, and many countries being affected by high tides and storm surges, there were no reported fatalities in Socotra, though there were 5 people reported dead in Karnataka, India, due to heavy rains.

== Meteorological history ==
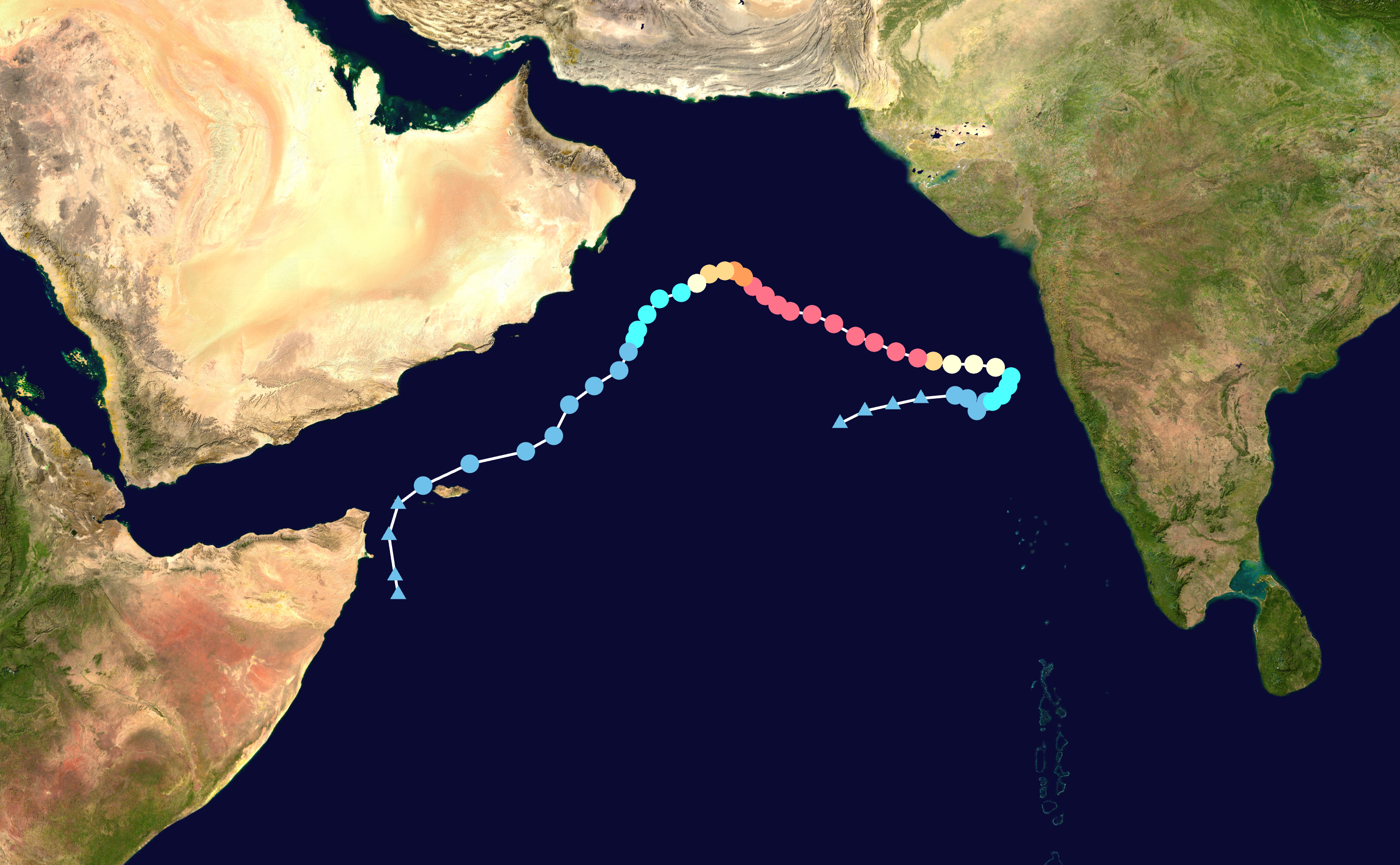
Map plotting the storm's track and intensity, according to the Saffir–Simpson scale Map key Saffir–Simpson scale Tropical depression (≤38 mph, ≤62 km/h) Tropical storm (39–73 mph, 63–118 km/h) Category 1 (74–95 mph, 119–153 km/h) Category 2 (96–110 mph, 154–177 km/h) Category 3 (111–129 mph, 178–208 km/h) Category 4 (130–156 mph, 209–251 km/h) Category 5 (≥157 mph, ≥252 km/h) Unknown Storm type Tropical cyclone Subtropical cyclone Extratropical cyclone, remnant low, tropical disturbance, or monsoon depression

A low-pressure area formed on October 17 in the Arabian Sea west of India near the Lakshadweep islands. Around that time, the India Meteorological Department (IMD) anticipated that the low would eventually develop into a tropical cyclone. The low remained in the same general region for a few days, becoming well-marked by October 22. The IMD classified the system as a Depression early on October 24, upgrading it to a Deep Depression later that day. On the same day, the Joint Typhoon Warning Center (JTWC) began issuing warnings on the system, classifying it as Tropical Cyclone 04A.

The Deep Depression initially moved to the northeast, towards the west coast of India. Early on October 25, the IMD upgraded the system to a Cyclonic Storm, naming it Kyarr. Later that day, the storm turned northward and intensified further into a Severe Cyclonic Storm. Warm water temperatures of around 28 °C (82 °F), as well as low wind shear, fueled rapid intensification. Kyarr turned to the northwest, away from India, on October 26. On the same day, the IMD upgraded the storm to a Very Severe Cyclonic Storm, and later, to an Extremely Severe Cyclonic Storm. Early on October 27, the IMD upgraded Kyarr further to a Super Cyclonic Storm, the first one in the Arabian Sea since Gonu in 2007; it was also the only recorded Super Cyclonic Storm in the Arabian Sea to occur after the monsoon season. The IMD estimated the peak maximum sustained winds of 240 km/h (150 mph), with a minimum central pressure of 922 mbar (27.2 inHg) estimated by the IMD. The JTWC estimated slightly higher winds of 250 km/h (155 mph).

At its peak, Kyarr had a well-defined eye, surrounded by well-defined rainbands and outflow. For about 12 hours, Kyarr maintained peak intensity, although it remained a super cyclonic storm for about 51 hours while moving toward the Arabian Peninsula. On October 30, the storm began weakening as the track shifted to the west, falling to the intensity of a Severe Cyclonic Storm. On the same day, Kyarr co-existed with Extremely Severe Cyclonic Storm Maha, marking the first time on record that there were two simultaneous Cyclonic Storms in the Arabian Sea. Kyarr turned to the southwest, paralleling the coastline of the Arabian Peninsula offshore. On October 31, Kyarr weakened to a Deep Depression, and Kyarr deteriorated further into a Depression on the next day. The storm's circulation passed just north of Socotra on November 2. Shortly afterward, the system weakened into a remnant low off the northern coast of Somalia, before dissipating on the next day.

== Preparations and impact ==
Due to the large circulation of the cyclone, the IMD recommended all fishermen avoid sailing in the Arabian Sea for five days. The Indian Coast Guard rescued at least 19 fishermen caught by the storm. The Indian Navy rescued 17 fishermen from a boat that sank amid high seas west of Mumbai. On October 24, Kyarr washed ashore the chemical tanker Nu-Shi Nalini near Dona Paula in Goa state, which was carrying naphtha, an explosive. The material was salvaged about a month after the storm, and was eventually shipped in early January 2020. Also offshore, the cyclone forced two AIDA cruise ships to reroute their paths.

In advance of the tropical cyclone, the IMD issued rain and surf alerts for the Indian states of Maharashtra, Karnataka, and Goa. As Kyarr approached western India, the cyclone dropped heavy rainfall onshore, peaking at 400 mm (16 in) in Malvan, Maharashtra. In Goa, the rains caused flash flooding, while strong winds felled trees and power lines. In Mumbai, the storm's heavy rains contributed to a dengue outbreak, with a 70% increase in cases of the mosquito-borne disease in December 2019 compared to the same month in 2018. In Gujarat, more than 157,000 farmers filed insurance claims due to damage related to Kyarr, with most of the losses related to groundnut and cotton. The state government reimbursed farmers for their losses. 5 people killed from rain-related incidents in Karnataka, India.

In southern Pakistan, officials closed beaches and opened four shelters due to high tides from the cyclone. Floods affected parts of Karachi, closing a section of Defence Raya Golf and Country Club, killing 200, and damaging 2000 houses.

High tides from Kyarr flooded towns on the coast of Oman. In neighboring United Arab Emirates, high tides flooded streets, houses, and schools in eastern coastal areas of Sharjah and Fujairah. Heavy rainfall from the outskirts of Kyarr also caused flooding in Dubai.

Kyarr started to slow down as it moved through the Arabian Sea, and it dissipated before reaching Socotra Island.

== See also ==
- Tropical cyclones in 2019
- List of the most intense tropical cyclones
- List of Arabian Peninsula tropical cyclones
- 1999 Odisha cyclone
- Cyclone Gonu (2007)
- Cyclone Phet (2010)
- Cyclone Chapala (2015)
- Cyclone Amphan (2020)
- Cyclone Nisarga (2020)
