= 2019 North Indian Ocean cyclone season =

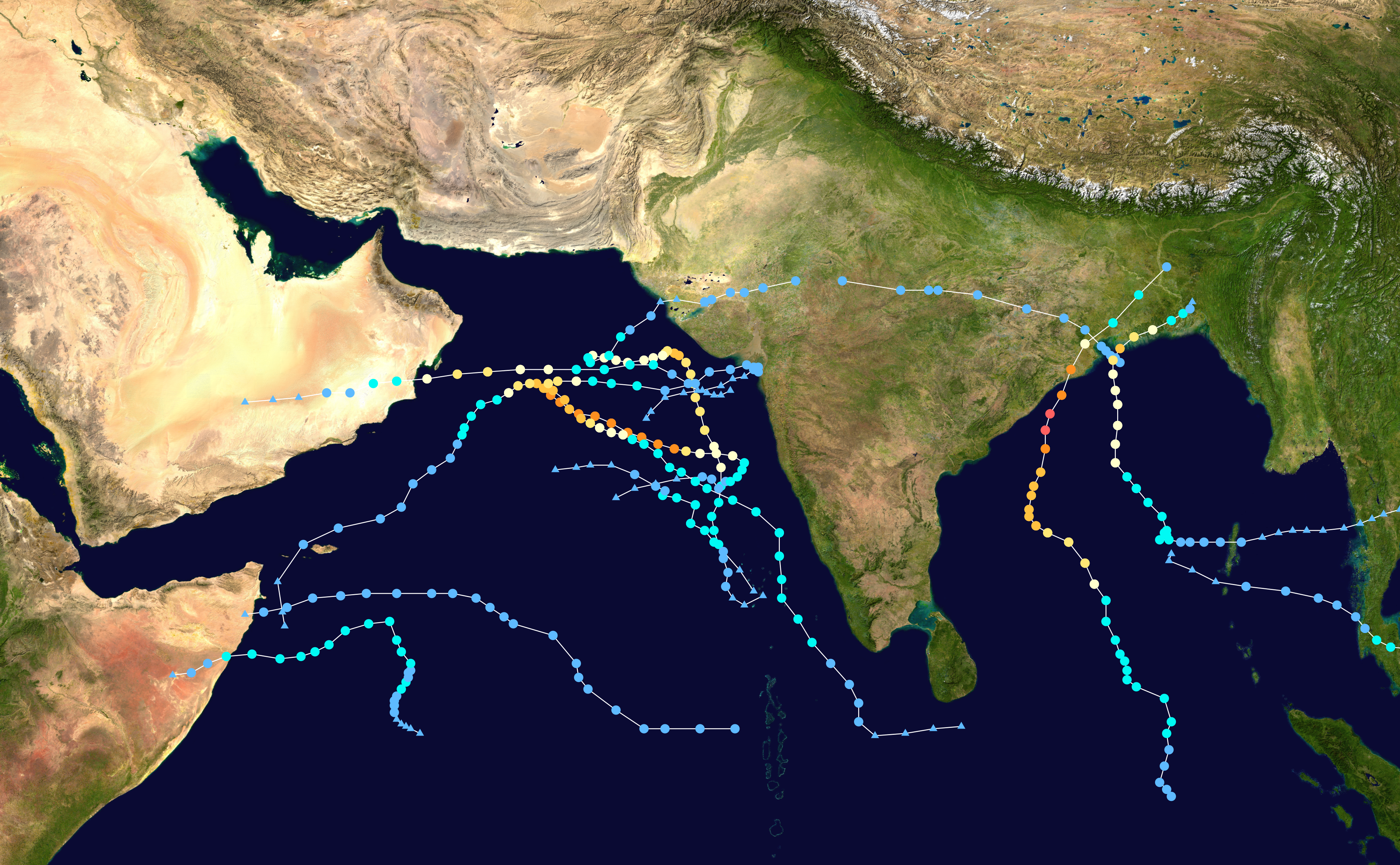
- Season summary map

Seasonal boundaries
- First system formed: January 4, 2019
- Last system dissipated: December 10, 2019

Strongest storm
- Name: Kyarr
  - Maximum winds: 240 km/h (150 mph) (3-minute sustained)
  - Lowest pressure: 922 hPa (mbar)

Seasonal statistics
- Depressions: 12
- Deep depressions: 11
- Cyclonic storms: 8 (second highest, tied with 1976)
- Severe cyclonic storms: 6 (record high, tied with 2023)
- Very severe cyclonic storms: 6 (record high)
- Extremely severe cyclonic storms: 3 (record high, tied with 1999 and 2023)
- Super cyclonic storms: 1
- Total fatalities: 185 total
- Total damage: > $11.63 billion (2019 USD) (Fourth-costliest North Indian Ocean cyclone season on record)

Related articles
- 2019 Atlantic hurricane season; 2019 Pacific hurricane season; 2019 Pacific typhoon season

The 2019 North Indian Ocean cyclone season was the most active North Indian Ocean cyclone season on record. The season featured 12 depressions, 11 deep depressions, 8 cyclonic storms, 6 severe cyclonic storms, 6 very severe cyclonic storms, 3 extremely severe cyclonic storms, and 1 super cyclonic storm, Kyarr, the first since Cyclone Gonu in 2007. Additionally, in terms of the damage incurred, it became the fourth-costliest season recorded in the North Indian Ocean, only behind the 2008, the 2020 and 2025 seasons.

The season's first named storm, Pabuk, entered the basin on January 4, becoming the earliest-forming cyclonic storm of the North Indian Ocean on record. The second cyclone of the season, Cyclone Fani, at the time was the strongest tropical cyclone in the Bay of Bengal by 3-minute maximum sustained wind speed until it got tied with Cyclone Mocha of 2023, and minimum barometric pressure since the 1999 Odisha cyclone, while being equal in terms of maximum 3-minute sustained wind speed to 2007's Sidr and 2013's Phailin. Further activity occurred in October, and in the latter part of that month, the first and only super cyclonic storm of the 2010s, Kyarr, formed.

The scope of this article is limited to the Indian Ocean in the Northern Hemisphere, east of the Horn of Africa and west of the Malay Peninsula. There are two main seas in the North Indian Ocean — the Arabian Sea to the west of the Indian subcontinent, abbreviated ARB by the India Meteorological Department (IMD); and the Bay of Bengal to the east, abbreviated BOB by the IMD. The systems that form over land are abbreviated as LAND by the IMD. The official Regional Specialized Meteorological Centre in this basin is the India Meteorological Department (IMD), while the Joint Typhoon Warning Center (JTWC) and the National Meteorological Center of CMA (NMC) unofficially release full advisories. On average, three to four cyclonic storms form in this basin every season.

== Season summary ==
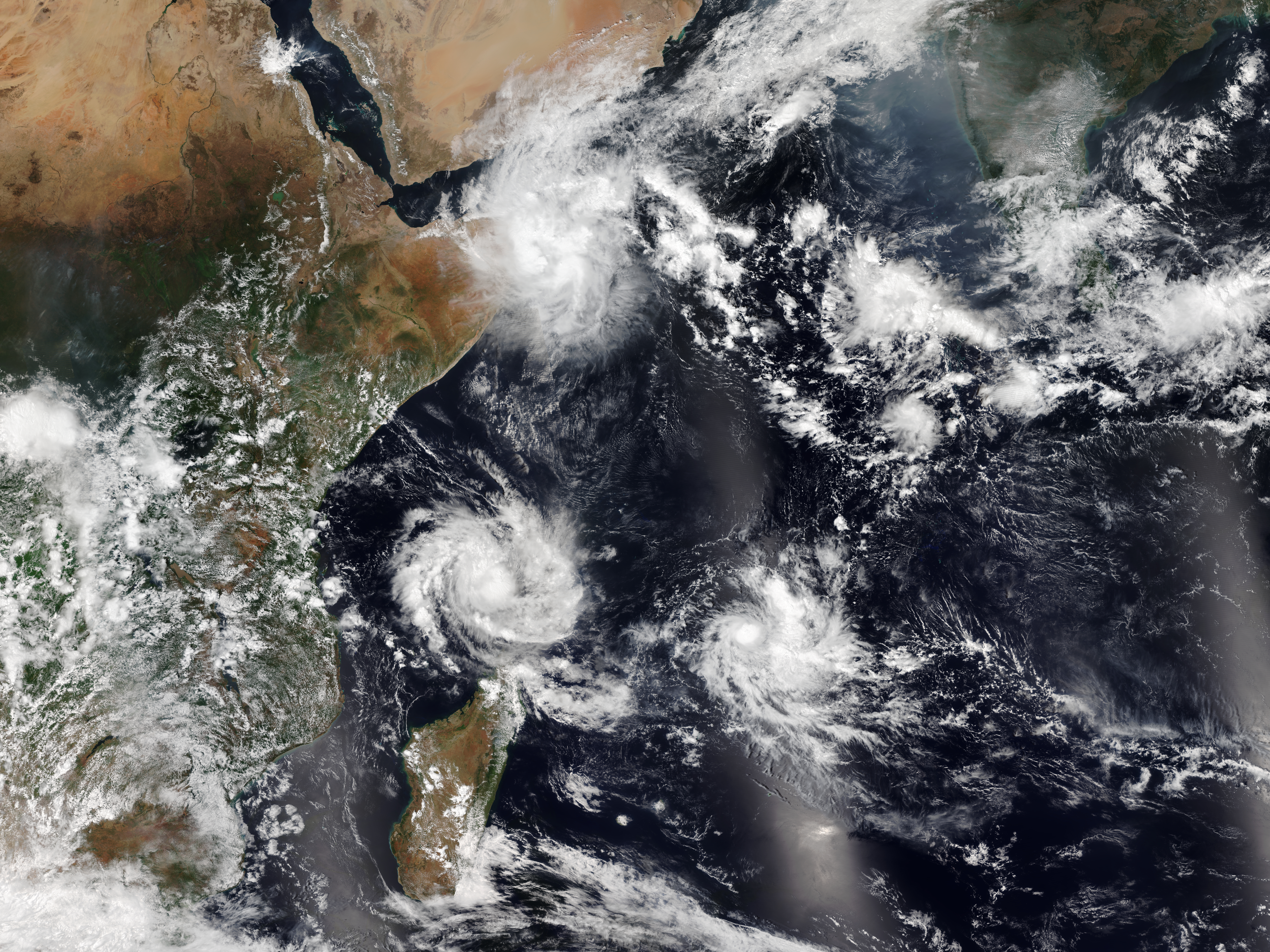
Cyclonic Storm Pawan and Tropical Cyclones Belna and Ambali on December 6

The season had eight cyclonic storms, six very severe cyclonic storms and one super cyclonic storm, becoming exceptionally active. Amid a weak El Niño event, the season's first named storm, Pabuk, entered the basin on January 4, becoming the earliest-forming cyclonic storm of the North Indian Ocean on record, tying with the 2014 season. The second cyclonic storm of the season, Fani, formed on April 26. Fani became an extremely severe cyclonic storm on April 30, reaching the equivalent of Category 5 status on the Saffir–Simpson scale, then made landfall in India killing 89 people between Odisha and Bangladesh; Fani caused $8.1 billion in damage.

In early June, a strong pulse of the Madden–Julian oscillation (MJO) led to the development of the third cyclonic storm, Vayu, which formed June 10 in the Arabian Sea near the Maldives. The storm subsequently intensified into a very severe cyclonic storm on June 12, after moving northwestward towards northwestern India and Pakistan. No tropical cyclones formed in the month of July. Deep Depression BOB 03 formed on August 7 before impacting East India and Bangladesh. In late September, Deep Depression ARB 02 formed near Gujarat and intensified into the fourth cyclonic storm of the season, Hikaa. Cyclonic Storm Kyarr formed on October 24 and three days later became the first super cyclonic storm since Cyclone Gonu in 2007. The sixth cyclonic storm and a record-breaking fifth very severe cyclonic storm, Cyclone Maha, formed on October 30. On November 5, the remnants of Severe Tropical Storm Matmo crossed into the basin and redeveloped into Very Severe Cyclonic Storm Bulbul. Three more deep depressions would form in the Arabian Sea in December, with one strengthening into the eighth cyclone of the season, Cyclonic Storm Pawan, which made landfall in Somalia on December 6.

The high amount of activity in the Arabian Sea was related to the strongest Indian Ocean Dipole in 60 years, in which the waters are warmer in the western Indian Ocean than the eastern.

Tropical cyclones have been recorded in the North Indian Ocean since 1891. The 2019 season was the first since 1902 that experienced the development of six severe cyclonic storms out of eight cyclonic storms; in 1902, five cyclonic storms formed and four of them became severe cyclonic storms. The season also produced the most accumulated cyclone energy in this basin on record.

== Systems ==
=== Cyclonic Storm Pabuk ===
- Cyclonic storm (IMD)
- Tropical storm (SSHWS)
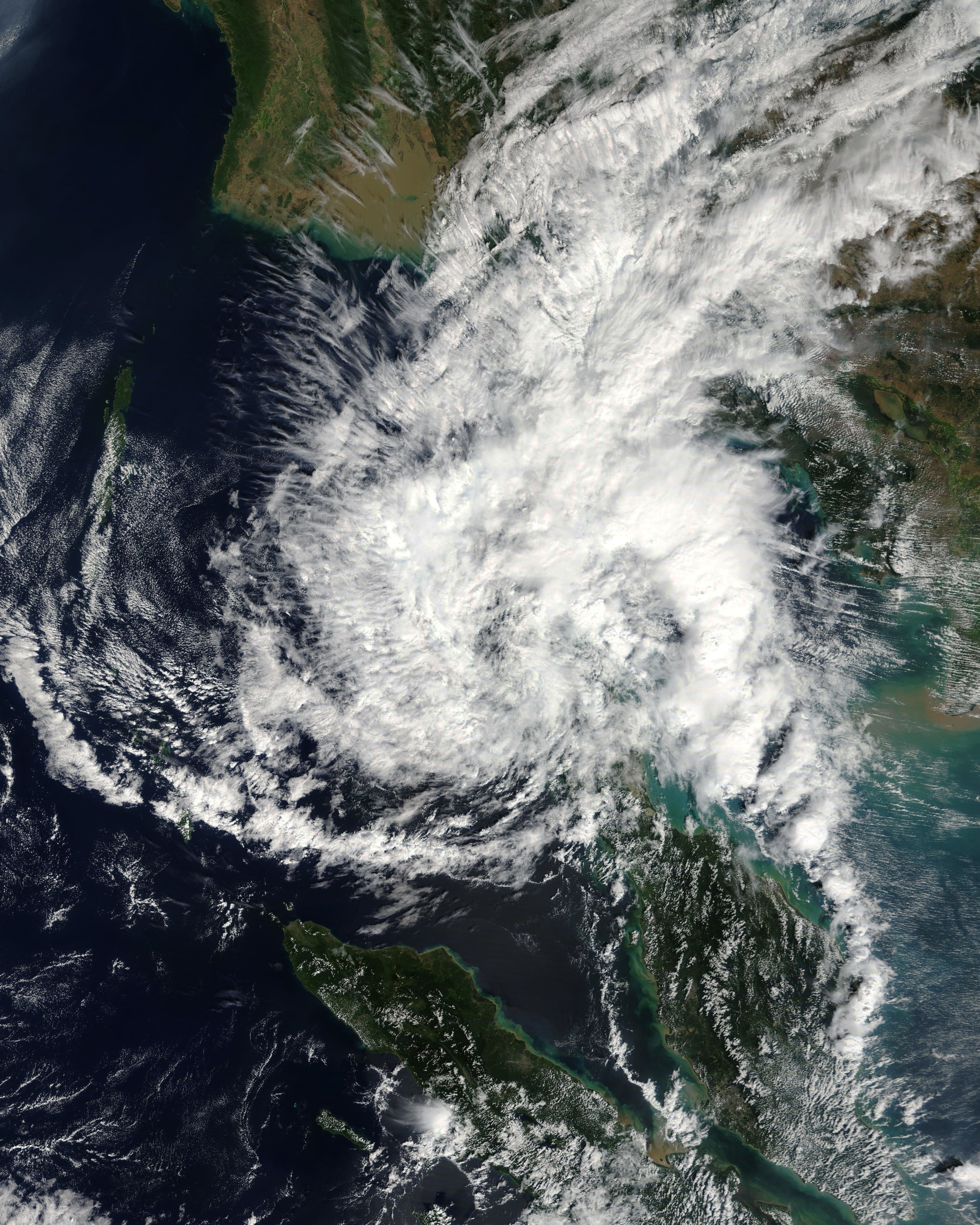
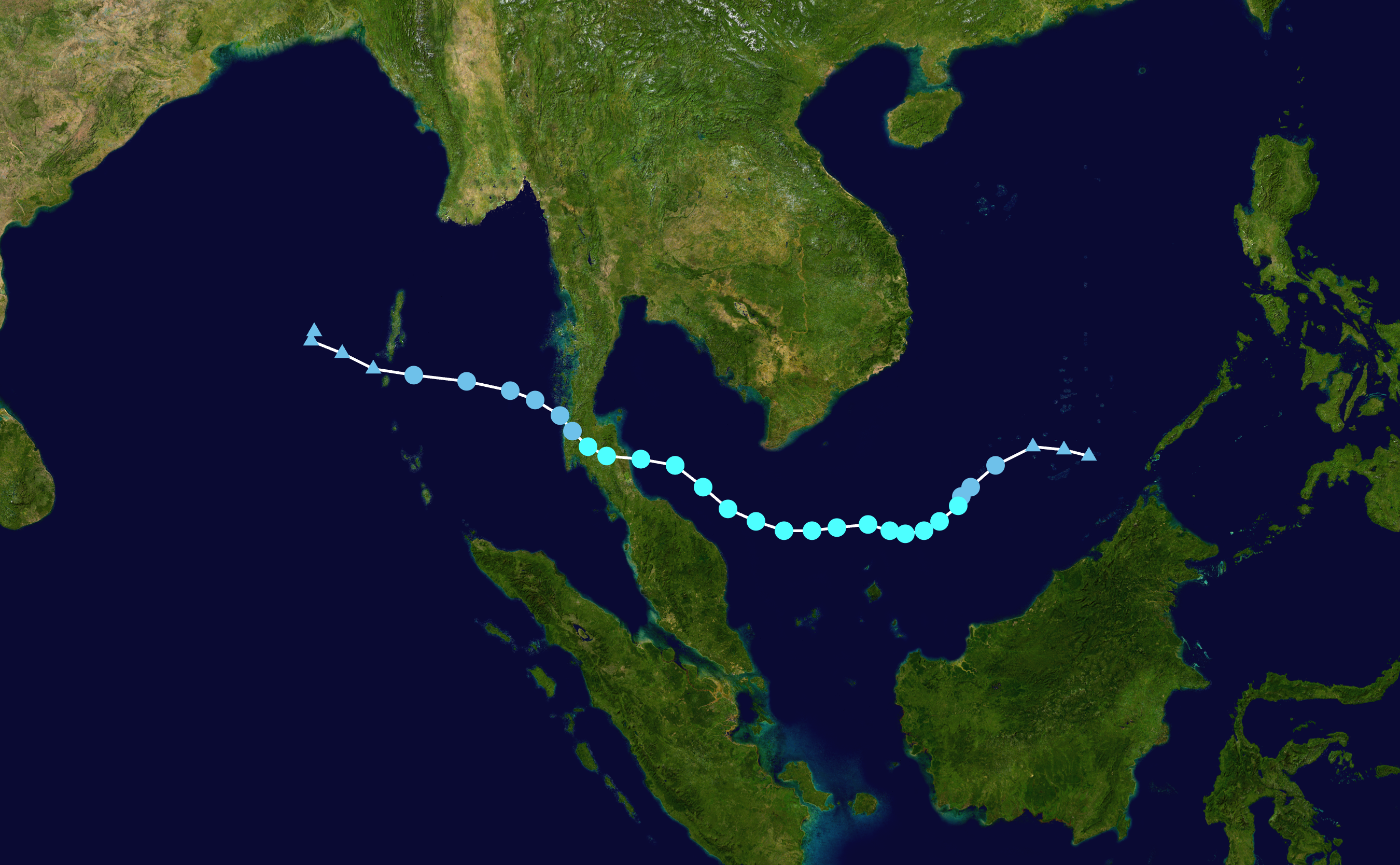
- Duration: January 4 (Entered basin) – January 7
- Peak intensity: 85 km/h (50 mph) (3-min); 998 hPa (mbar)

Pabuk originated in a low pressure area which formed in the South China Sea on December 28, which later became a depression on December 31. On January 1 at 06:00 UTC, it became a tropical storm with JMA naming it "Pabuk". It maintained its intensity until making landfall over the Pak Phanang District of Thailand on January 4 at 05:40 UTC. On the morning of January 5, it entered the basin, and the India Meteorological Department (IMD) began giving advisories to the system. As it entered the basin, it was designated as "Cyclonic Storm Pabuk" by the IMD. Pabuk became a deep depression at 06:00 UTC the next day, because of high wind shear and a weak MJO. It was further downgraded to a depression at 00:00 UTC on January 7, because of similar unfavorable conditions. The next day, it weakened into a well-marked low pressure area.

Pabuk caused gusty winds and heavy rainfall over the Andaman and Nicobar Islands with no significant damage reported in the island. However, in Thailand it claimed the lives of eight people and caused an estimated US$156 million in property damage.

=== Extremely Severe Cyclonic Storm Fani ===
- Extremely severe cyclonic storm (IMD)
- Category 5 tropical cyclone (SSHWS)
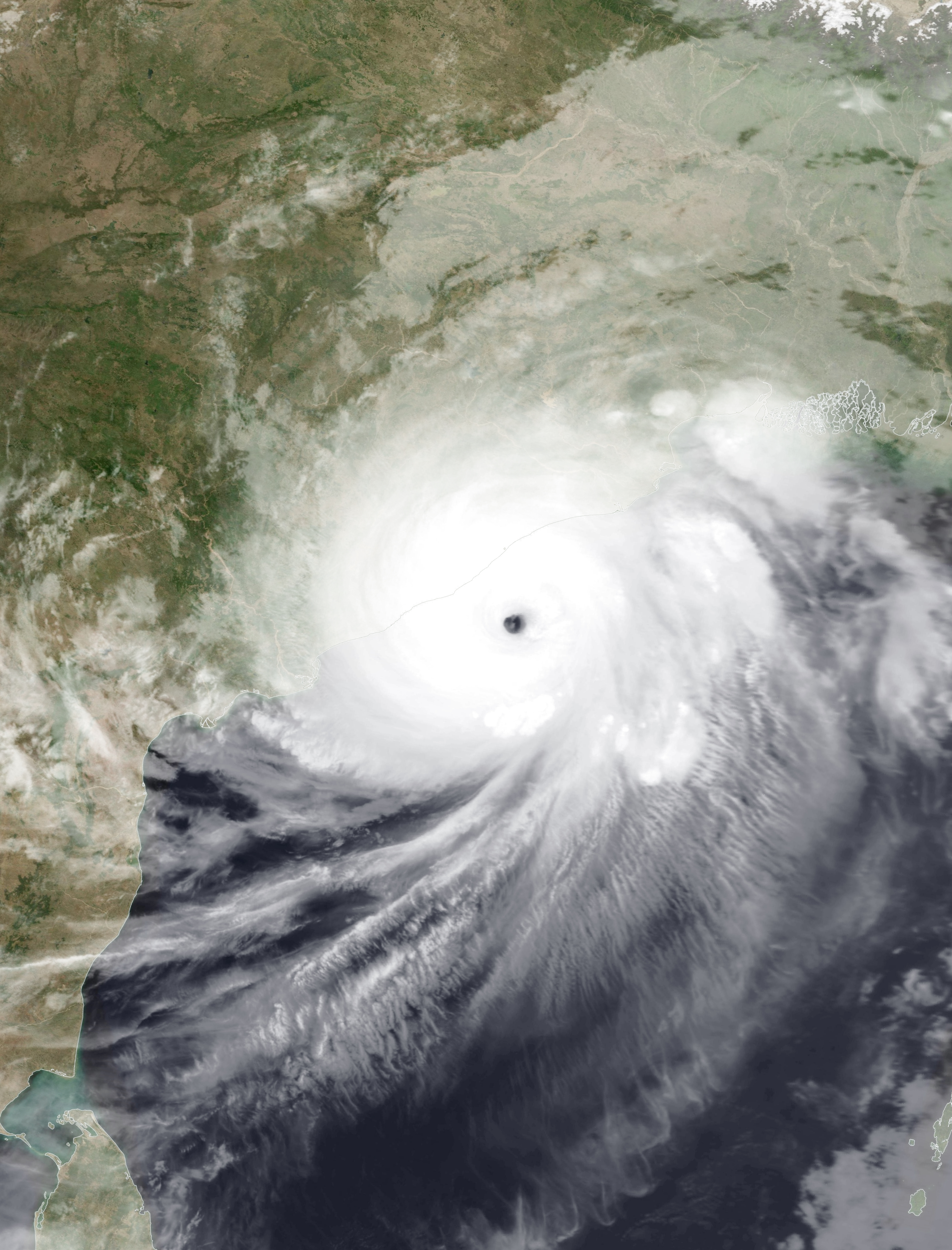
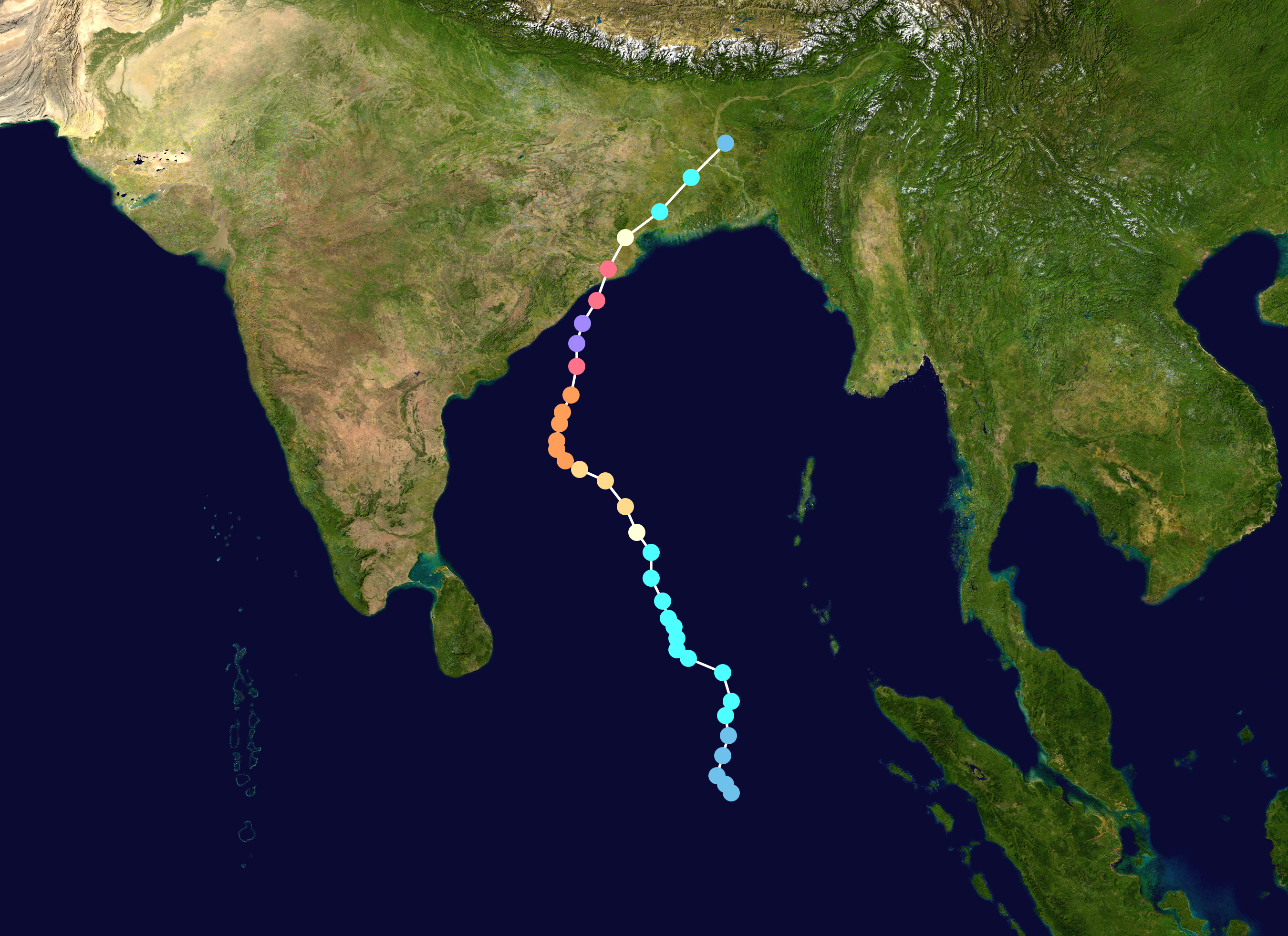
- Duration: April 26 – May 4
- Peak intensity: 215 km/h (130 mph) (3-min); 932 hPa (mbar)

On April 26, a depression formed to the west of Sumatra, with the IMD giving the storm the identifier BOB 02. The system slowly organized while curving towards the northeast. On April 27, at 00:00 UTC, the IMD upgraded the system to a deep depression. Later that day, the system intensified into Cyclonic Storm Fani, while shifting to the northwest. (Note: The name Fani (Bengali: ফণী, [fɔniˑ]) was contributed by Bangladesh and means "serpent, hooded snake" in Bengali.) System development proceeded very slowly for several days, with the cyclone struggling to intensify against the influence of moderate vertical wind shear. At 12:00 UTC on 29 April, Fani was upgraded to a severe cyclonic storm, with the system beginning to undergo rapid intensification. Fani continued rapidly intensifying, becoming an extremely severe cyclonic storm at 17:00 UTC on April 30. The Joint Typhoon Warning Center (JTWC) upgraded the system to a Category 4 tropical cyclone on the Saffir–Simpson scale at 06:00 UTC on May 2, following which, rapid intensification resumed. The pressure decreased to 932 hPa (27.52 inHg), three-minute sustained winds increased to 215 kilometres per hour (134 mph), and one-minute sustained winds to 280 kilometres per hour (170 mph), making the system the equivalent of a Category 5 major hurricane. On May 3, at 02:30 UTC (8:00 a.m. IST) Fani made landfall on Puri, in Odisha, weakening to a Category 1-equivalent very severe cyclonic storm soon after landfall, subsequently weakening to a cyclonic storm several hours later. On May 4, Fani weakened into a deep depression and moved into Bangladesh. Later that day, Fani degenerated into a well-marked remnant low before dissipating the next day.

=== Very Severe Cyclonic Storm Vayu ===
- Very severe cyclonic storm (IMD)
- Category 3 tropical cyclone (SSHWS)
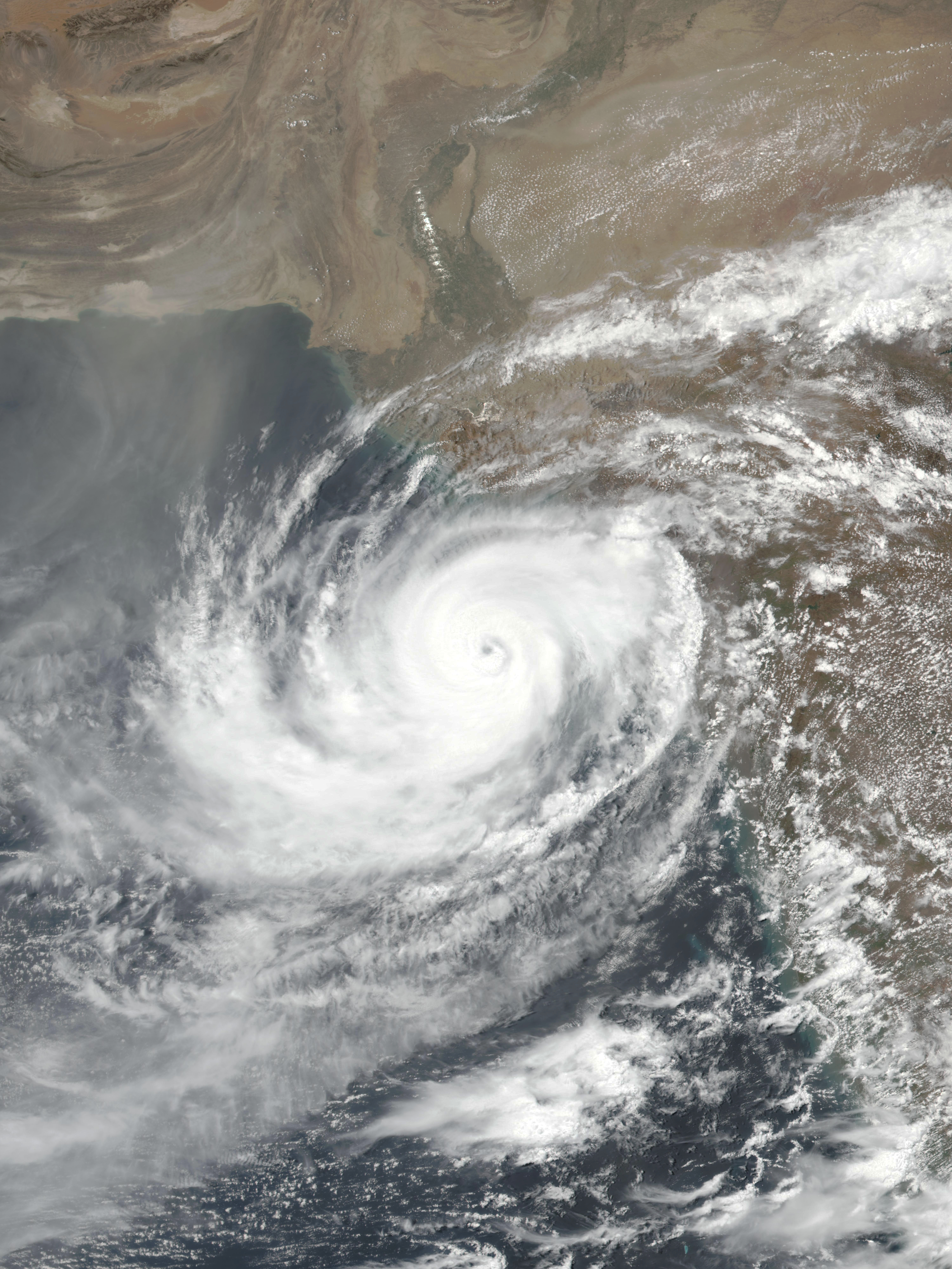
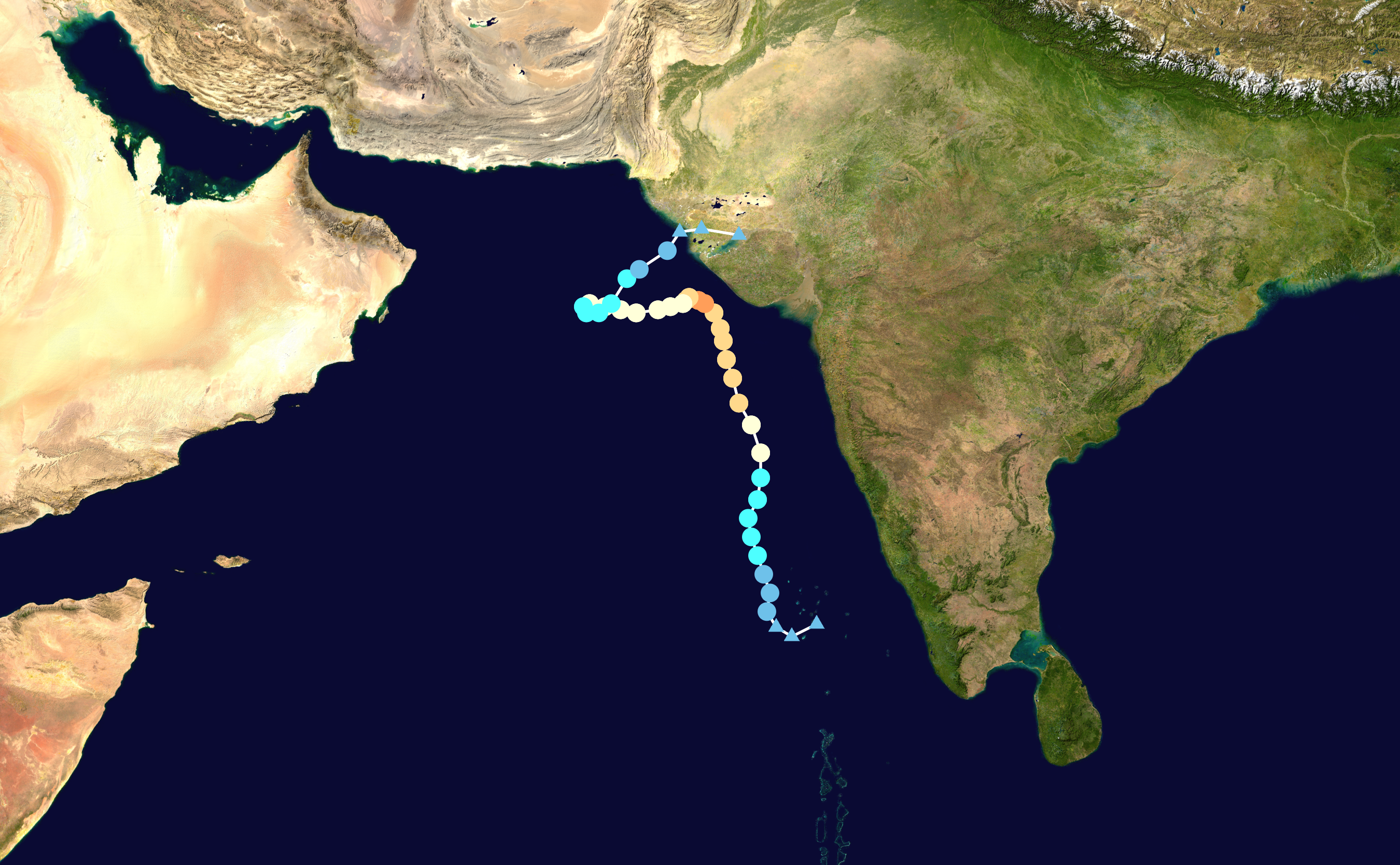
- Duration: June 10 – June 17
- Peak intensity: 150 km/h (90 mph) (3-min); 970 hPa (mbar)

In early June, a strong pulse of the Madden–Julian oscillation (MJO) tracked eastwards into the tropical Indian Ocean, leading to increased cloudiness and rainfall across the region. On June 9, the India Meteorological Department (IMD) noted the development of a low-pressure area over the southeastern Arabian Sea, to the north of the Maldives. Early on June 10, a depression formed in the Arabian Sea, just northwest of the Maldives, and the IMD gave the storm the identifier ARB 01. As the system moved northward, it gradually strengthened, becoming a deep depression, before intensifying further into Cyclonic Storm Vayu later that day. (Note: The name Vayu (Hindi: वायु, [ʋäːjuː]) was contributed by India and means "wind, air" in Hindi.) After being upgraded by the IMD to a severe cyclonic storm on June 11, and concurrently by the JTWC to a Category 1 tropical cyclone on the Saffir–Simpson hurricane wind scale (SSHWS), the system began a period of rapid intensification. Vayu strengthened into a very severe cyclonic storm soon afterward, and became a Category 2-equivalent very severe cyclonic storm on June 12. On June 13, the influence of a strengthening subtropical ridge over Saudi Arabia caused Vayu to gradually slow down and turn to the west, as it approached the coastline of the state of Gujarat in northwestern India. Later that day, at 06:00 UTC, Vayu reached its peak intensity as a very severe tropical cyclone, with three-minute sustained winds of 150 kilometres per hour (93 mph) and a minimum pressure of 970 hPa (28.64 inHg). On June 14, Vayu began to weaken, as it tracked slowly westward, away from the Gujarat coastline due to strong wind shear. On June 16, an approaching mid-latitude trough weakened the areas of high pressure centered to the west and northeast, which recurved Vayu sharply to the northeast. Upon weakening further to a cyclonic storm, strong low-level southwesterly flow caused the system to accelerate northeastwards through the break in the blocking high-pressure ridge, back towards the Gujarat coast. At 03:00 UTC on 17 June, Vayu weakened into a deep depression, before weakening further to a depression six hours later. Soon afterward, Vayu weakened into a well-marked remnant low, just off the coast of Gujarat. Very early on June 18, Vayu's remnants crossed over the Gujarat coast and moved inland for another day, before dissipating on June 19.

=== Deep Depression BOB 03 ===
- Deep depression (IMD)
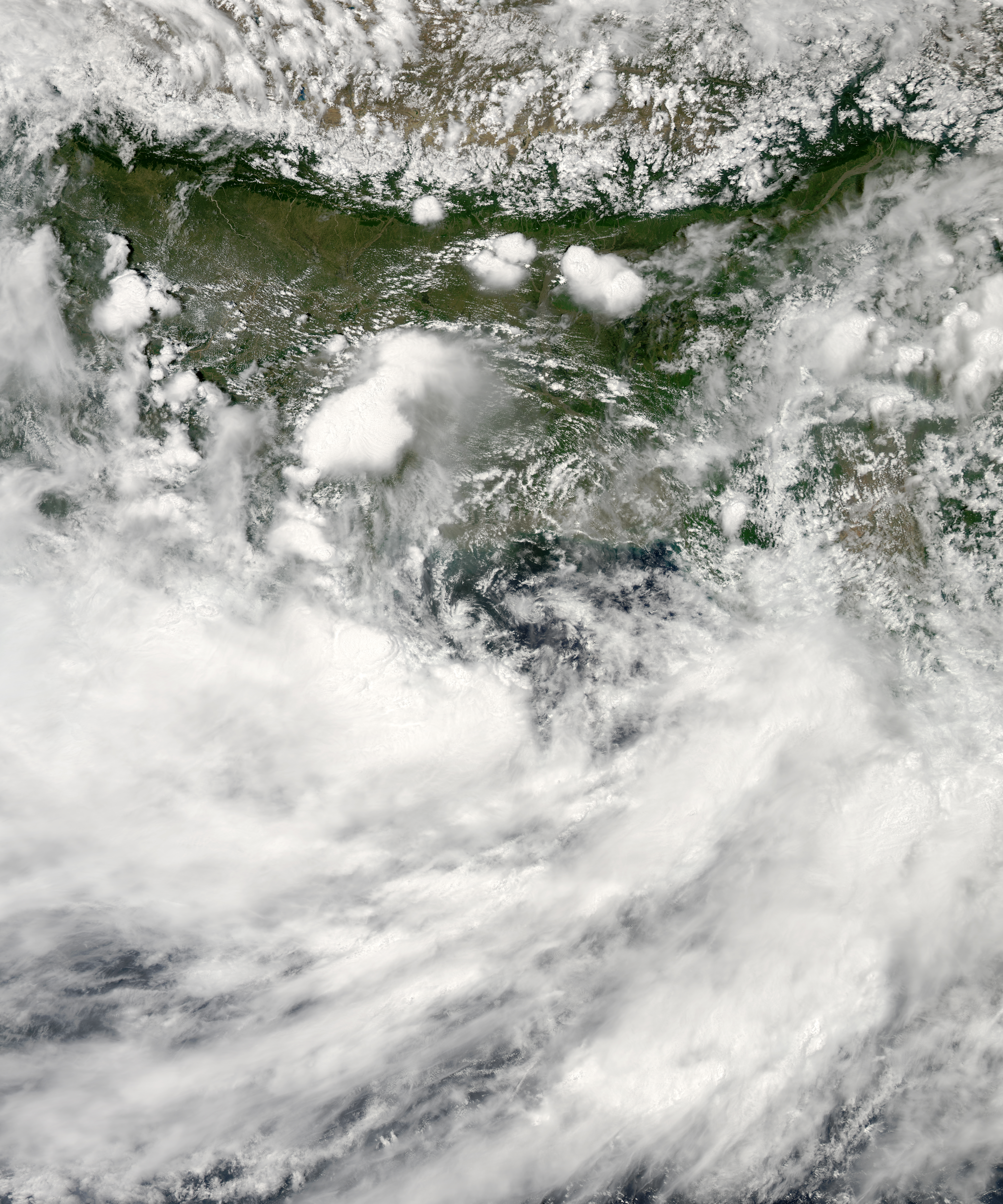
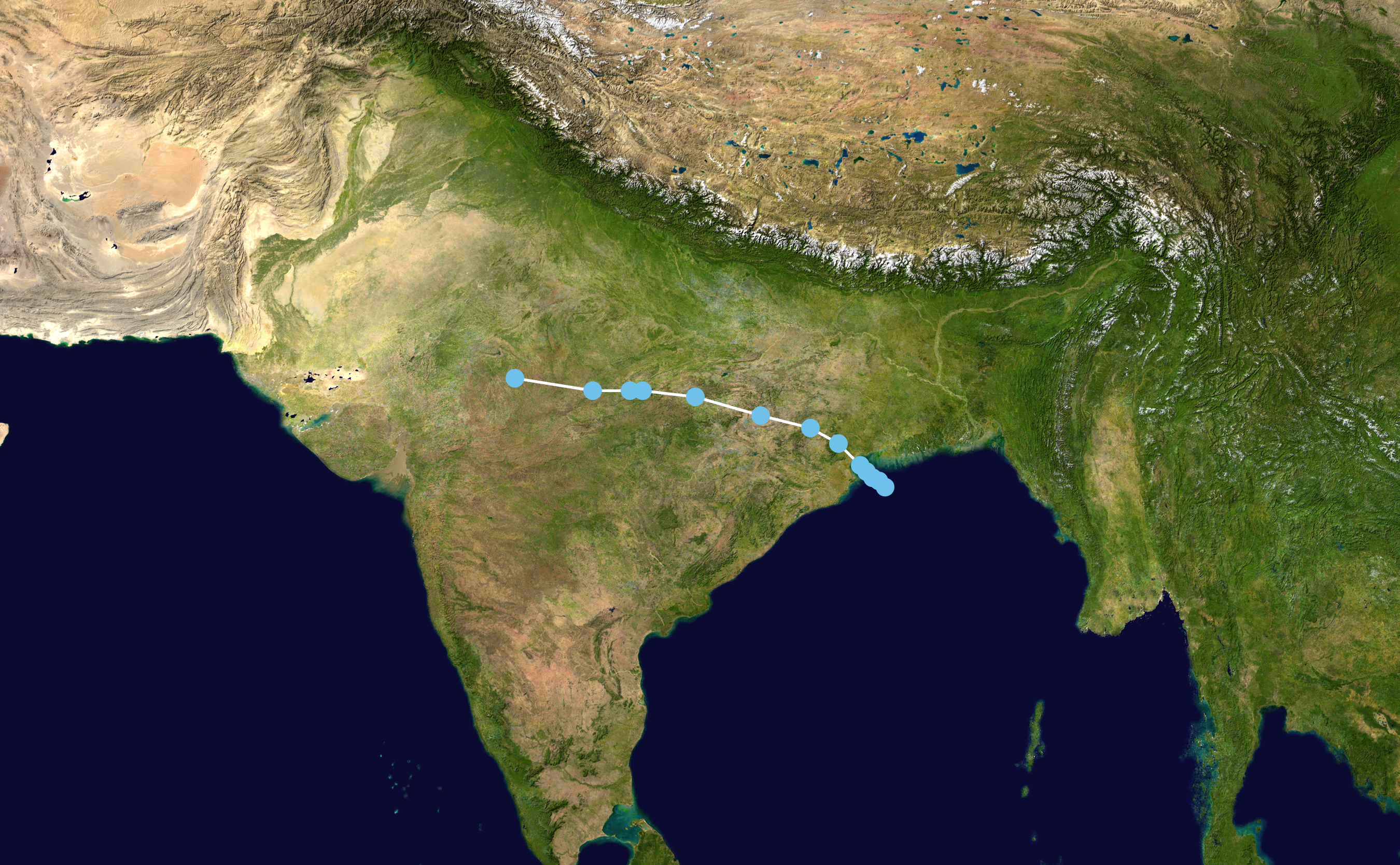
- Duration: August 6 – August 11
- Peak intensity: 55 km/h (35 mph) (3-min); 990 hPa (mbar)

On August 6, a depression formed over the northwestern Bay of Bengal, with the IMD giving the storm the identifier BOB 03. Soon afterward, the system intensified into a deep depression, while approaching the north Odisha coastline. On August 7, around 08:00–09:00 UTC, the deep depression made landfall along the north Odisha-West Bengal coastline. Early on August 11, it dissipated.

Heavy rains battered much of Odisha, with accumulations peaking at 382.6 mm (15.06 in) in Lanjigarh. Flooding across the state killed three people, left two missing, and affected 130,000 others. A total of 2,081 homes suffered damage, and 14,332 people required evacuation.

=== Very Severe Cyclonic Storm Hikaa ===
- Very severe cyclonic storm (IMD)
- Category 2 tropical cyclone (SSHWS)
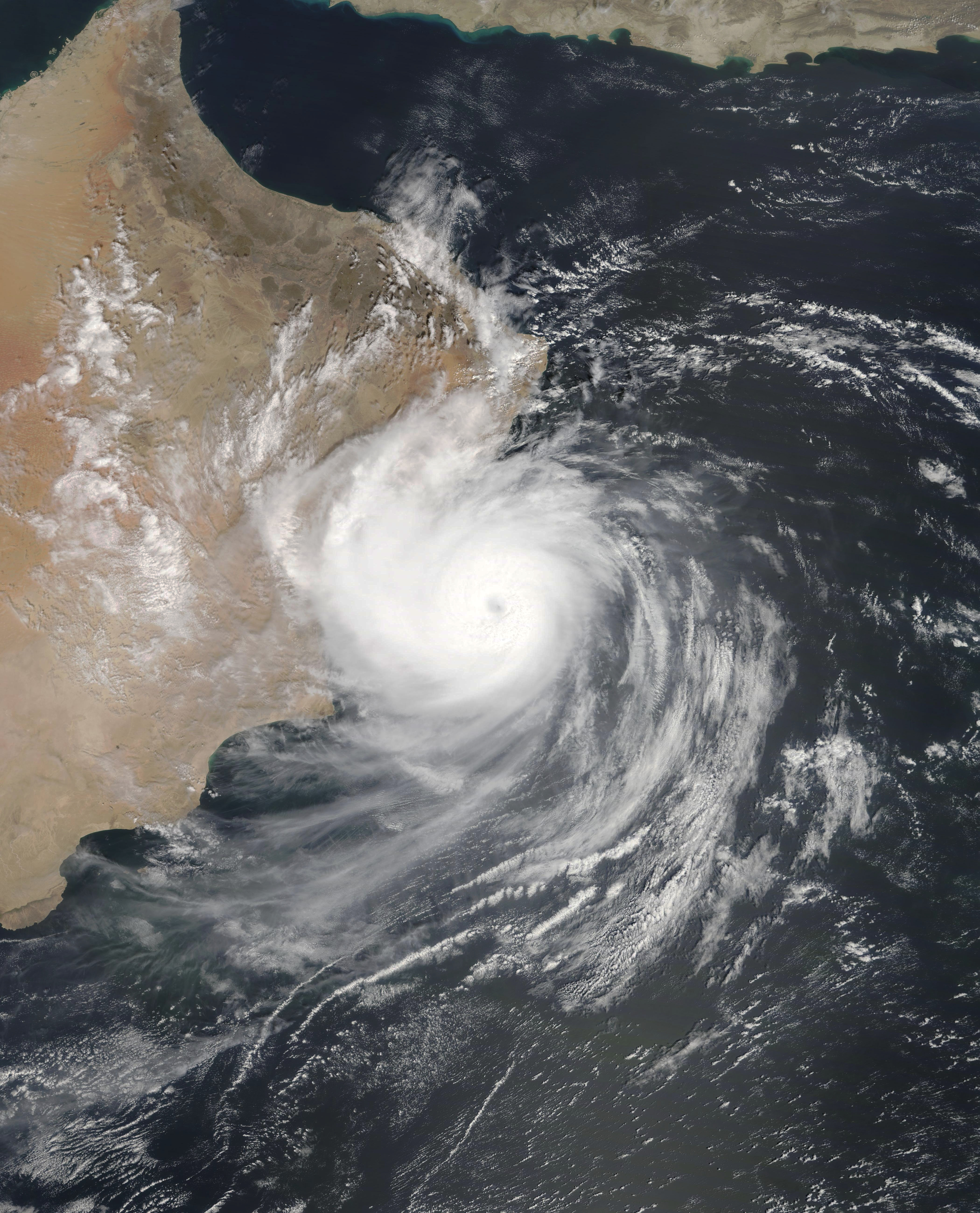
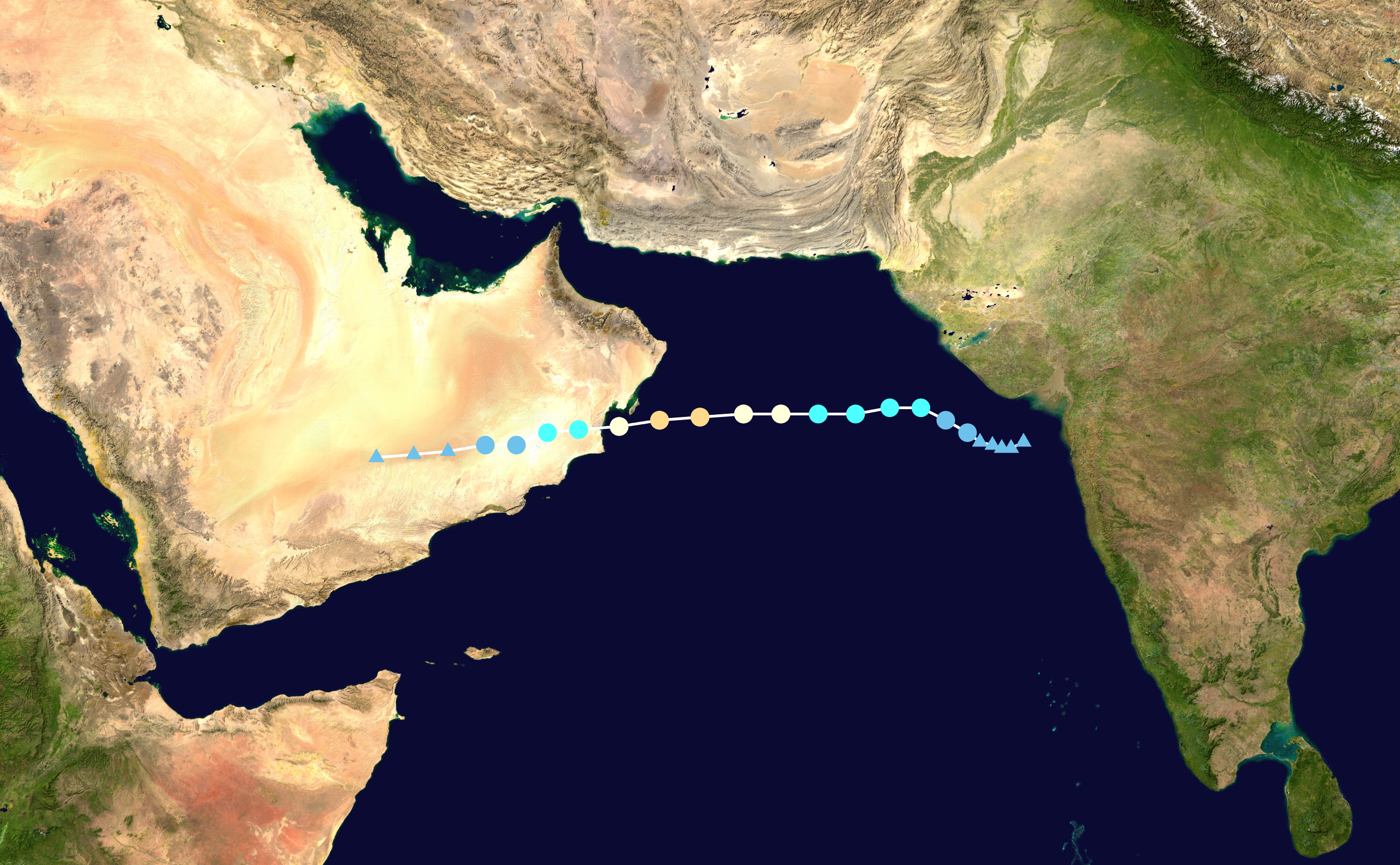
- Duration: September 22 – September 25
- Peak intensity: 140 km/h (85 mph) (3-min); 978 hPa (mbar)

A depression formed in the Arabian Sea and soon intensified into a cyclonic storm and was named Hikaa. (Note: The name Hikaa (Dhivehi: ހިކާ, [hikaː]) was contributed by the Maldives and means "wrasse" in Dhivehi.) The system gradually intensified into a severe cyclonic storm and then reached its peak intensity as a very severe cyclonic storm with 85 mph 3-min sustained wind speeds. Hikaa weakened due to dry air intrusions and made landfall on Oman as a severe tropical cyclone. Hikaa quickly weakened after moving inland and later dissipated.

One person went missing after his boat sank off Duqm. Off the Omani coast, a boat carried 11 Indian fishermen sank due to Cyclone Hikaa. As of October 17, six of them were confirmed dead, and the other five remained missing.

=== Depression LAND 01 ===
- Depression (IMD)
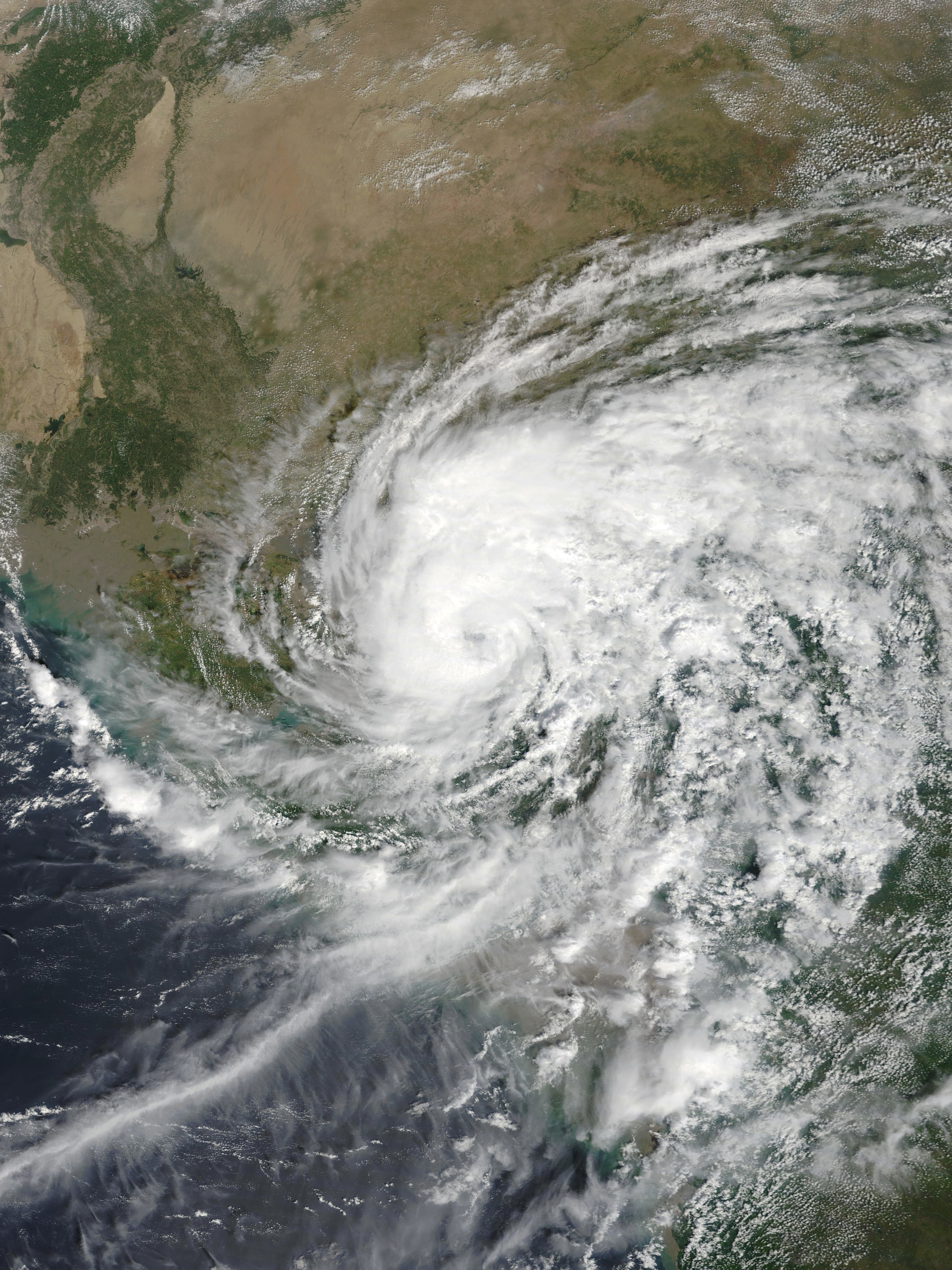
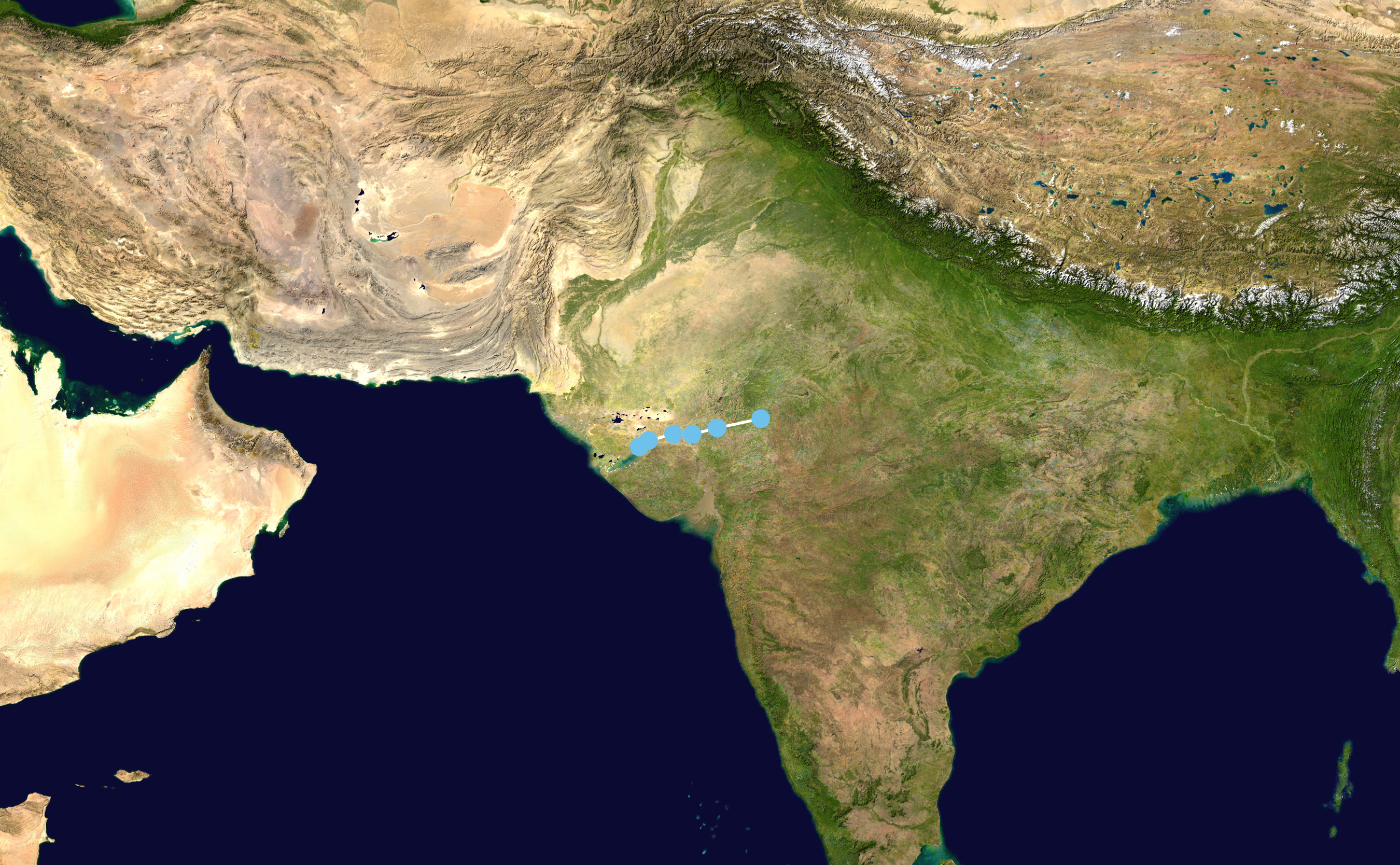
- Duration: September 29 – October 1
- Peak intensity: 45 km/h (30 mph) (3-min); 1002 hPa (mbar)

On September 28, a low pressure area formed on the adjoining areas of Saurashtra and Kutch in the state of Gujarat. The low pressure area later concentrated into a depression and moved close to Kandla at 12:00 UTC, next day. It moved east-northeastwards, towards eastern Rajasthan maintained its intensity and it developed a ragged eye until on October 1, it weakened into a low pressure area.

The system caused heavy to very heavy rainfall in isolated areas of Gujarat, mostly region of Saurashtra and Kutch, and east Rajasthan on September 29. On September 30, heavy rainfall in isolated areas were reported in Gujarat. Isolated places of Saurashtra and Kutch experienced very heavy to extremely heavy rainfall. On October 1, heavy to very heavy rainfall were reported in few places of Gujarat, with isolated regions experiencing extremely heavy rainfall. Heavy rainfall were also reported in Saurashtra and Kutch of Gujarat, eastern Rajasthan and western Madhya Pradesh.

=== Super Cyclonic Storm Kyarr ===
- Super cyclonic storm (IMD)
- Category 4 tropical cyclone (SSHWS)
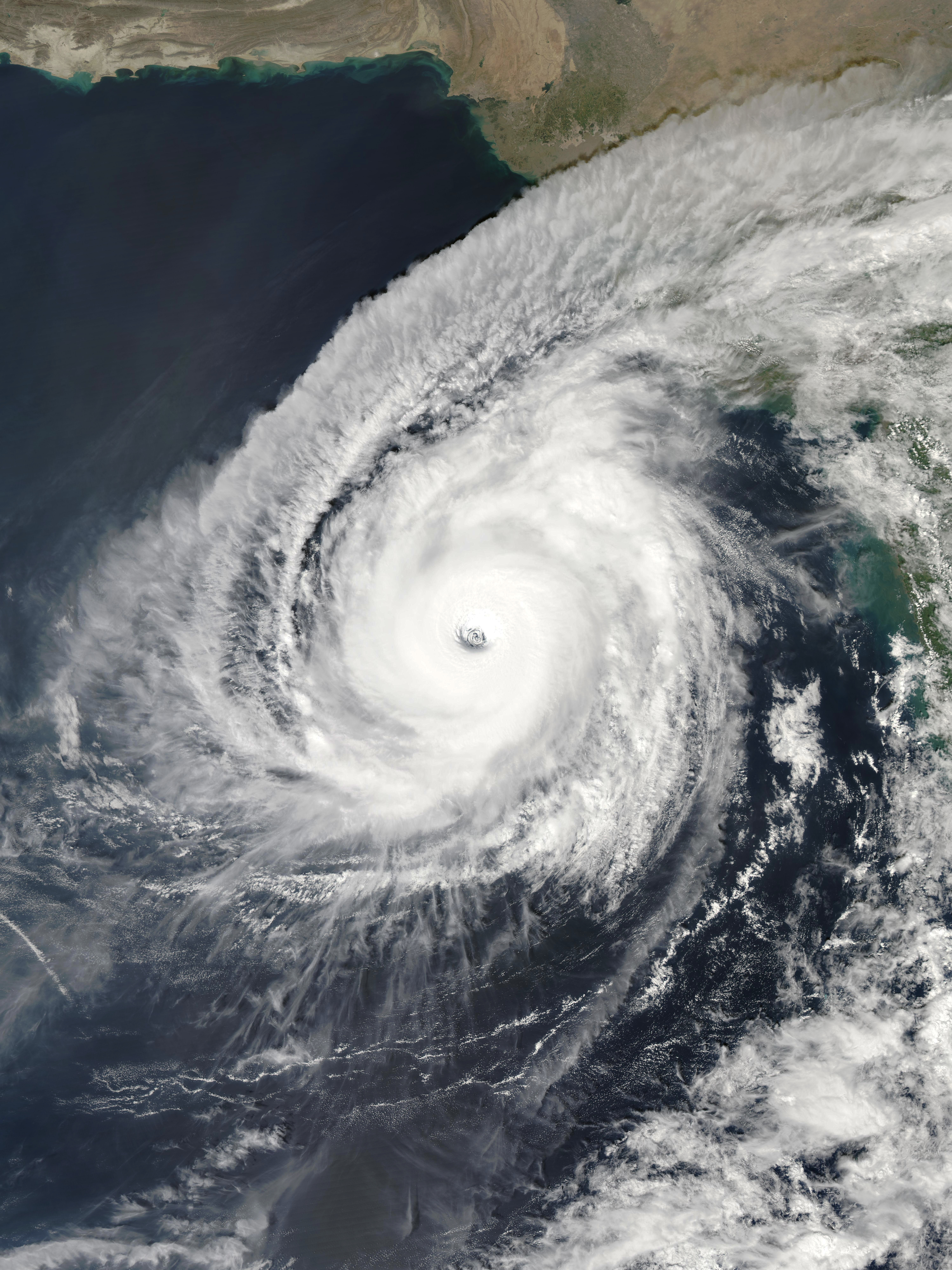
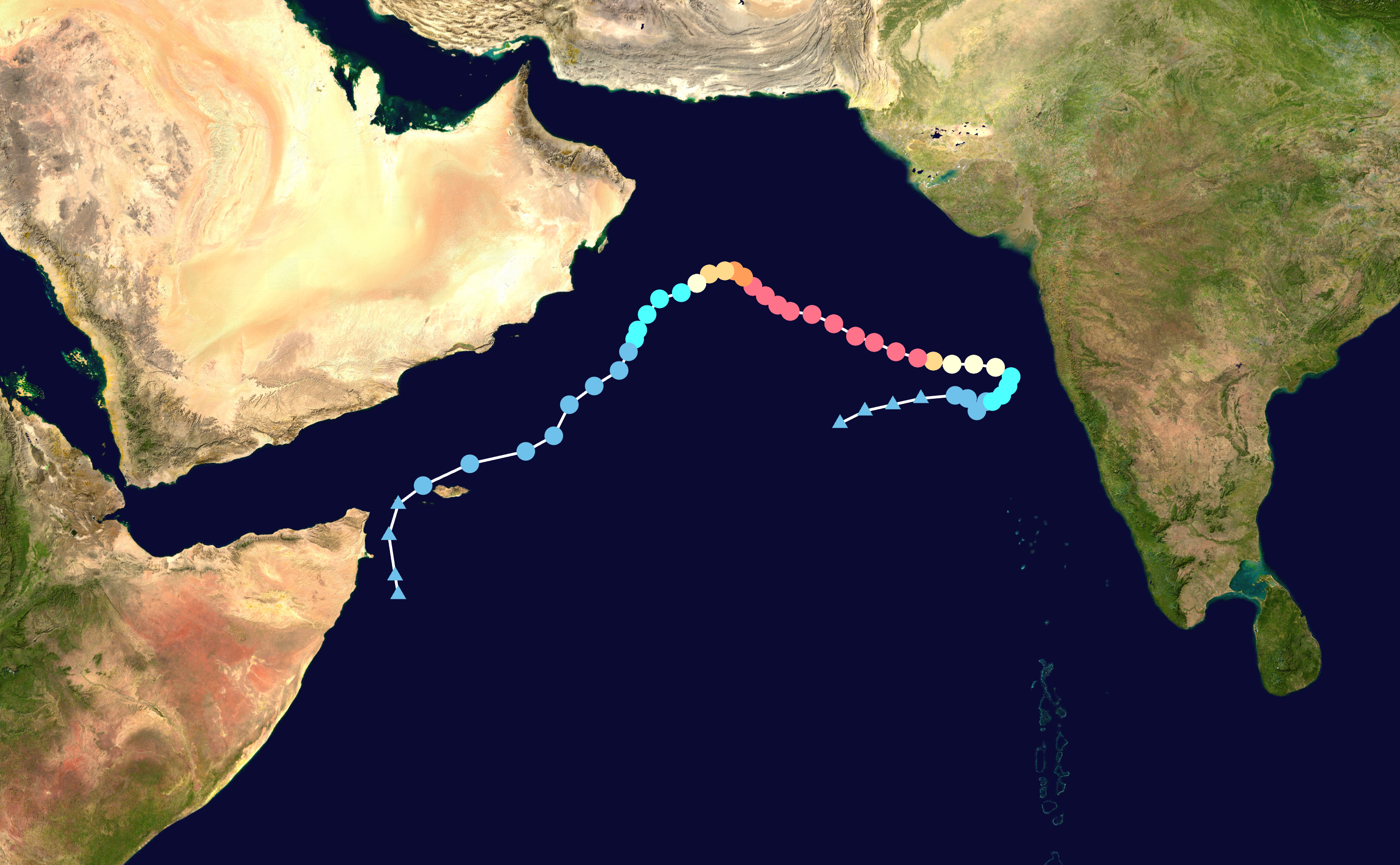
- Duration: October 24 – November 1
- Peak intensity: 240 km/h (150 mph) (3-min); 922 hPa (mbar)

A depression formed in the Arabian Sea on October 24, with IMD giving it the identifier ARB 03, later intensifying into a deep depression before JTWC recognized it as Tropical Cyclone 04A. It further intensified and became a cyclonic storm, receiving the name Kyarr from IMD as the fifth cyclonic storm of the season. (Note: The name Kyarr (Burmese: ကျား, [t͡ɕá]) was contributed by Myanmar and means "tiger" in Burmese.) On October 25, owing to high sea surface temperatures, low shear and a moist environment, Kyarr began a period of rapid intensification and strengthened into a very severe cyclonic storm. Three hours later, Kyarr became an extremely severe cyclonic storm. Early on October 27, Kyarr intensified into a super cyclonic storm, becoming the first one in the basin since Gonu in 2007. The system continued to intensify, attaining maximum three-minute sustained winds of 240 kilometres per hour (150 mph) and a minimum barometric pressure of 922 hPa (27.23 inHg), Kyarr began slowly weakening on October 29 as it headed southwest towards the direction of Somalia. Kyarr dissipated off the coast of Somalia on November 1.

Despite the immense strength of the storm, and many countries being affected by high tides and storm surges, there were no reported fatalities in Socotra, though there were 5 people reported dead in Karnataka, India, due to heavy rains.

=== Extremely Severe Cyclonic Storm Maha ===
- Extremely severe cyclonic storm (IMD)
- Category 3 tropical cyclone (SSHWS)
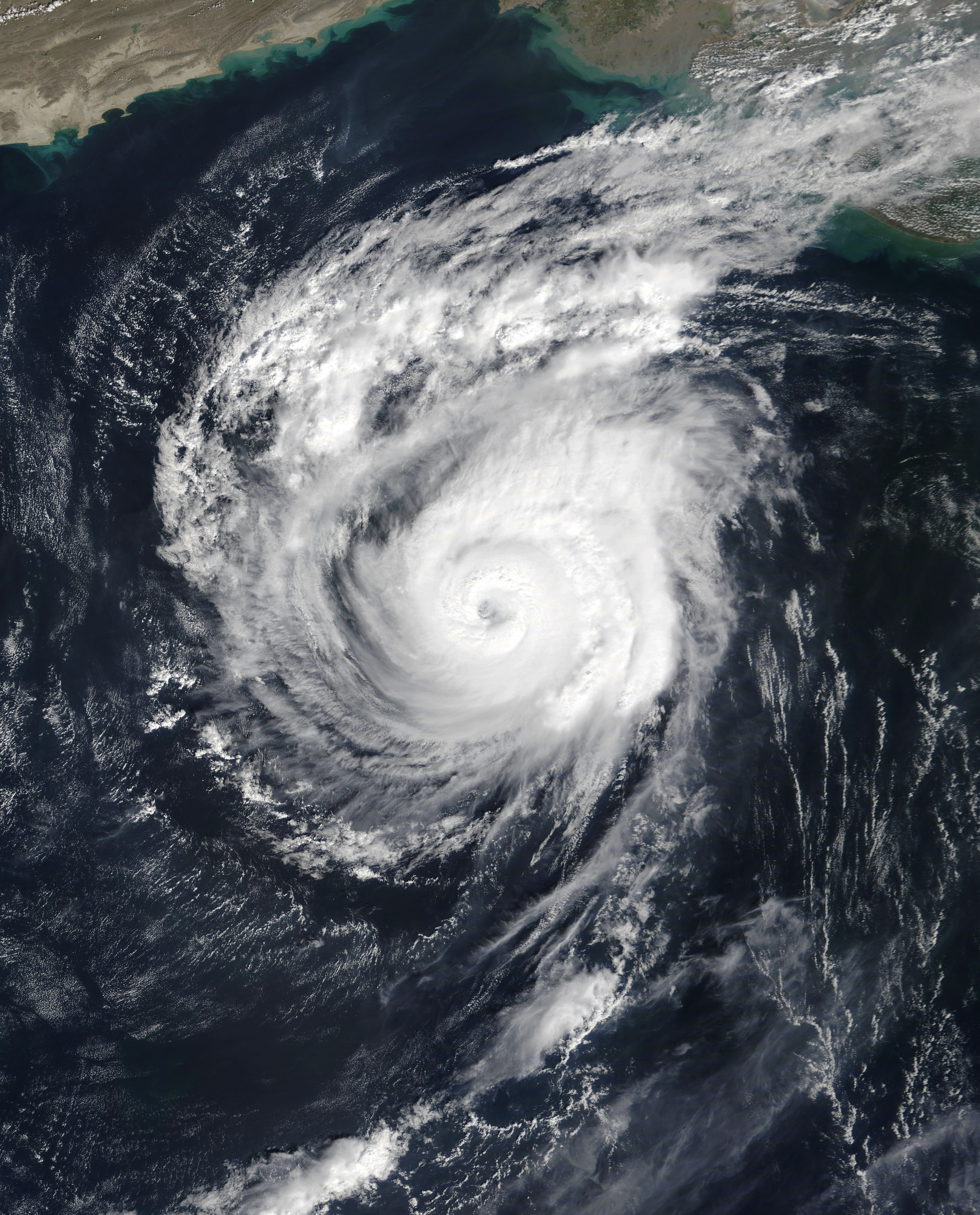
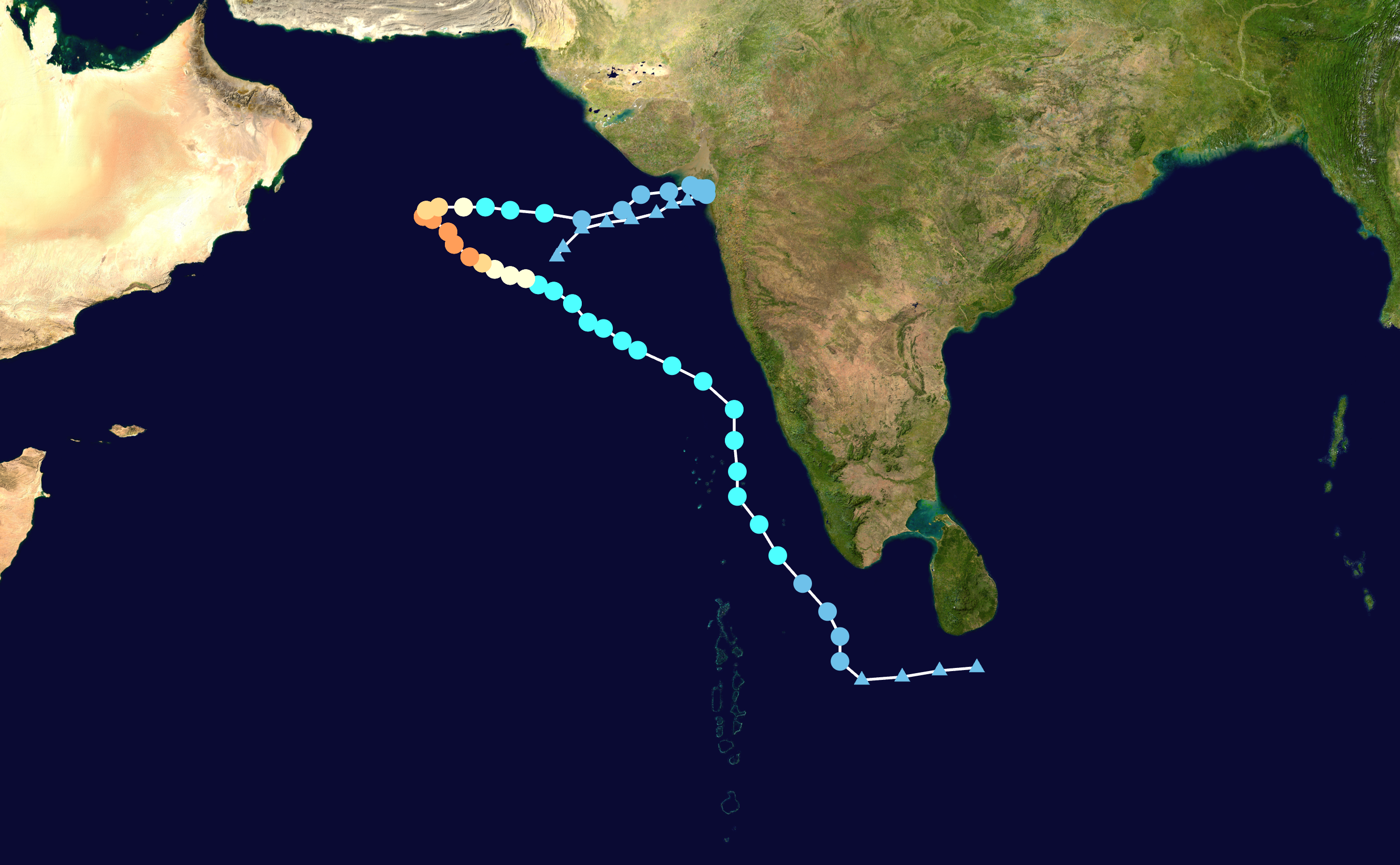
- Duration: October 30 – November 7
- Peak intensity: 175 km/h (110 mph) (3-min); 956 hPa (mbar)

A well-marked low-pressure area near the southwestern part of Sri Lanka strengthened into a depression on October 30. The depression would keep intensifying as it entered a more favorable environment, resulting in it upgraded into Cyclonic Storm Maha on November 1. (Note: The name Maha (Arabic: مها, [mahaː]) was contributed by Oman and refers to the Arabian oryx (Oryx leucoryx) in Arabic.) Maha continued to intensify, fluctuating in intensity for the next 2 days as it moved along the Indian coast, before becoming a very severe cyclonic storm on November 3. Maha would reach its peak intensity, strengthening into an extremely severe cyclonic storm the next day, before beginning to stall in the Arabian Sea due to a lack of steering currents. Upwelling would begin to take its toll on the storm, resulting in Maha weakening into a cyclonic storm as it approached Gujarat. It would later make landfall near Gujarat as a tropical depression and quickly weakened afterwards.

In preparation of Maha's impacts, orange alert was issued in four districts of Kerala.

=== Very Severe Cyclonic Storm Bulbul ===
- Very severe cyclonic storm (IMD)
- Category 3 tropical cyclone (SSHWS)
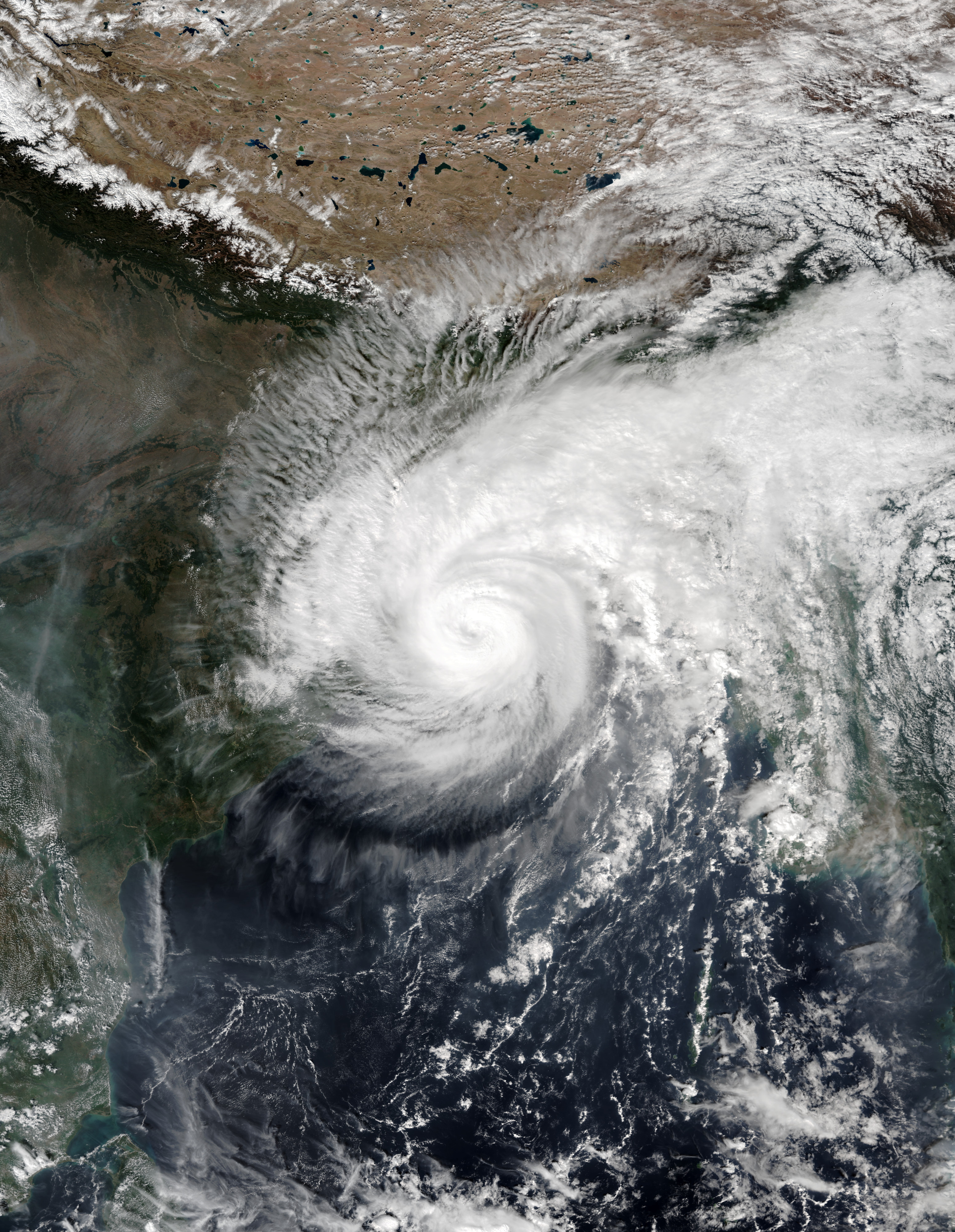
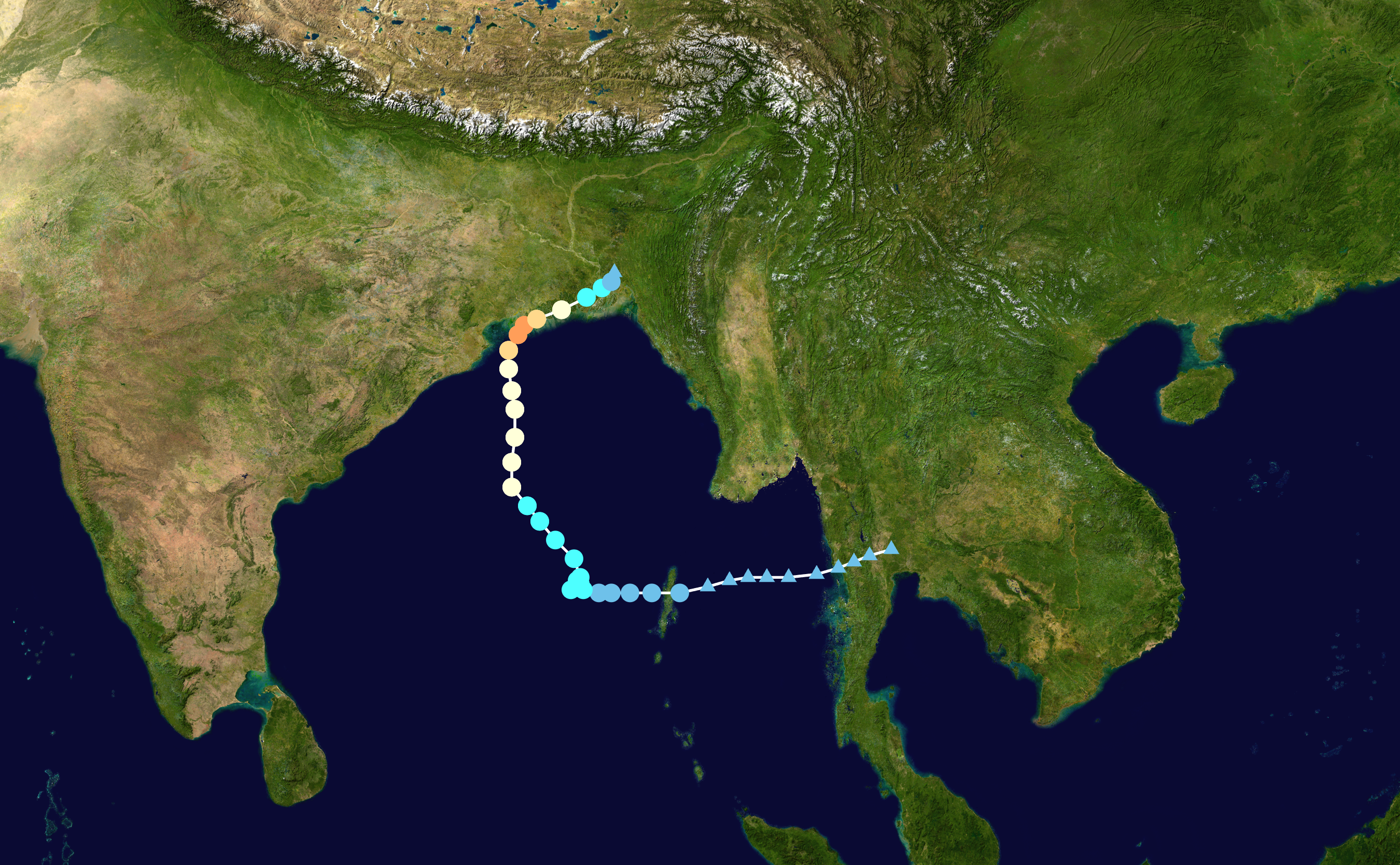
- Duration: November 5 – November 11
- Peak intensity: 140 km/h (85 mph) (3-min); 976 hPa (mbar)

On November 5, the remnants of Severe Tropical Storm Matmo traversed into the Bay of Bengal and developed into Cyclonic Storm Bulbul. (Note: The name Bulbul (Urdu: بلبل, [bʊlbʊl]) was contributed by Pakistan and refers to the bulbul or the common nightingale (Luscinia megarhynchos) in Urdu.) The system would intensify into a severe cyclonic storm on November 6 as it continued northward. Bulbul would undergo rapid intensification, becoming a very severe cyclonic storm on November 8.

Bulbul was the second severe cyclonic storm to make landfall in West Bengal after Cyclone Aila in 2009. Bulbul would produce heavy rain over parts of West Bengal with Digha receiving 98 mm, Kolkata receiving 101 mm, Halisahar recording 95 mm and Dum Dum receiving 90 mm of rain. Strong winds were also reported in many parts of South Bengal. Strong winds of 75 km/h also battered the Kolkata by uprooting many trees. One youth was killed due to uprooting of trees before the storm made landfall.

=== Cyclonic Storm Pawan ===
- Cyclonic storm (IMD)
- Tropical storm (SSHWS)
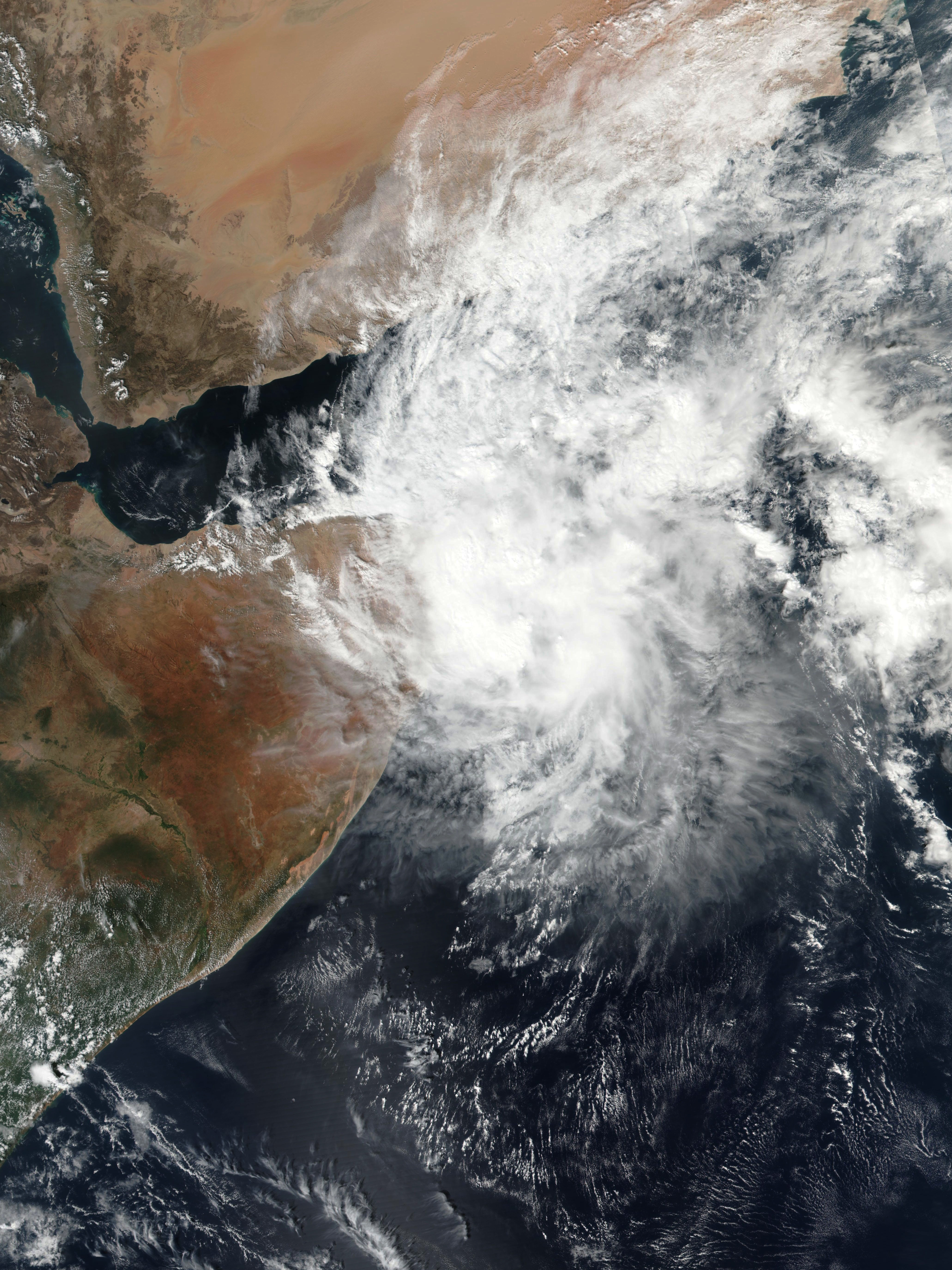
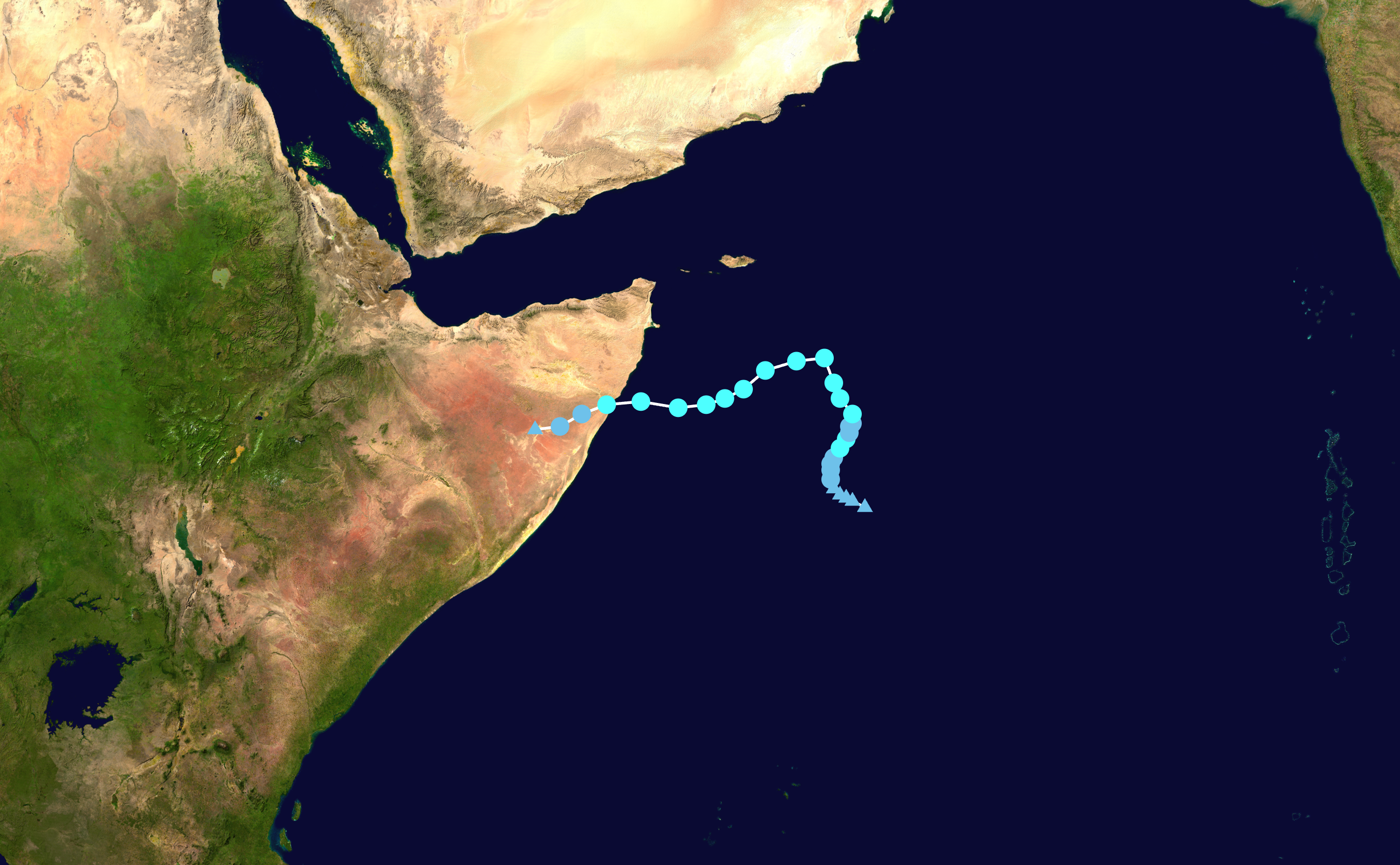
- Duration: December 2 – December 7
- Peak intensity: 75 km/h (45 mph) (3-min); 998 hPa (mbar)

On December 2, a depression formed over the southwestern Arabian Sea, east of Somalia. Due to being in a favorable environment for development, the depression strengthened into a cyclonic storm on December 4, earning the name Pawan. (Note: The name Pawan (Sinhala: පවන්, [paʋan]) was contributed by Sri Lanka and means "air, breeze" in Sinhala.) The system continued north, slowly strengthening, before turning west the following day, Pawan struggled to maintain its structure due to being in high wind shear, but continued to move west towards Somalia. Pawan's convection would briefly dissipate due to the wind shear, but soon regenerated. Pawan would make landfall in the Puntland region of Somalia, just south of Eyl, as a cyclonic storm late on December 6. Pawan would bring heavy rain and mudslides to parts of Somalia, before degenerating into a well-marked low-pressure area on December 7.

Pawan killed six people in Somalia. Rainfall accumulations brought by Pawan were up to 3 inches in Somalia, an unusually large amount of rain for December, resulting in flash flooding in the region. Two vehicles were swept away by torrential rain generated by the storm in Bosaso, while two boats capsized off the coast of Eyl due to rough surf. Pawan was the first tropical cyclone to make landfall in Somalia since Cyclone Sagar in 2018.

=== Deep Depression ARB 07 (07A) ===
- Deep depression (IMD)
- Tropical storm (SSHWS)
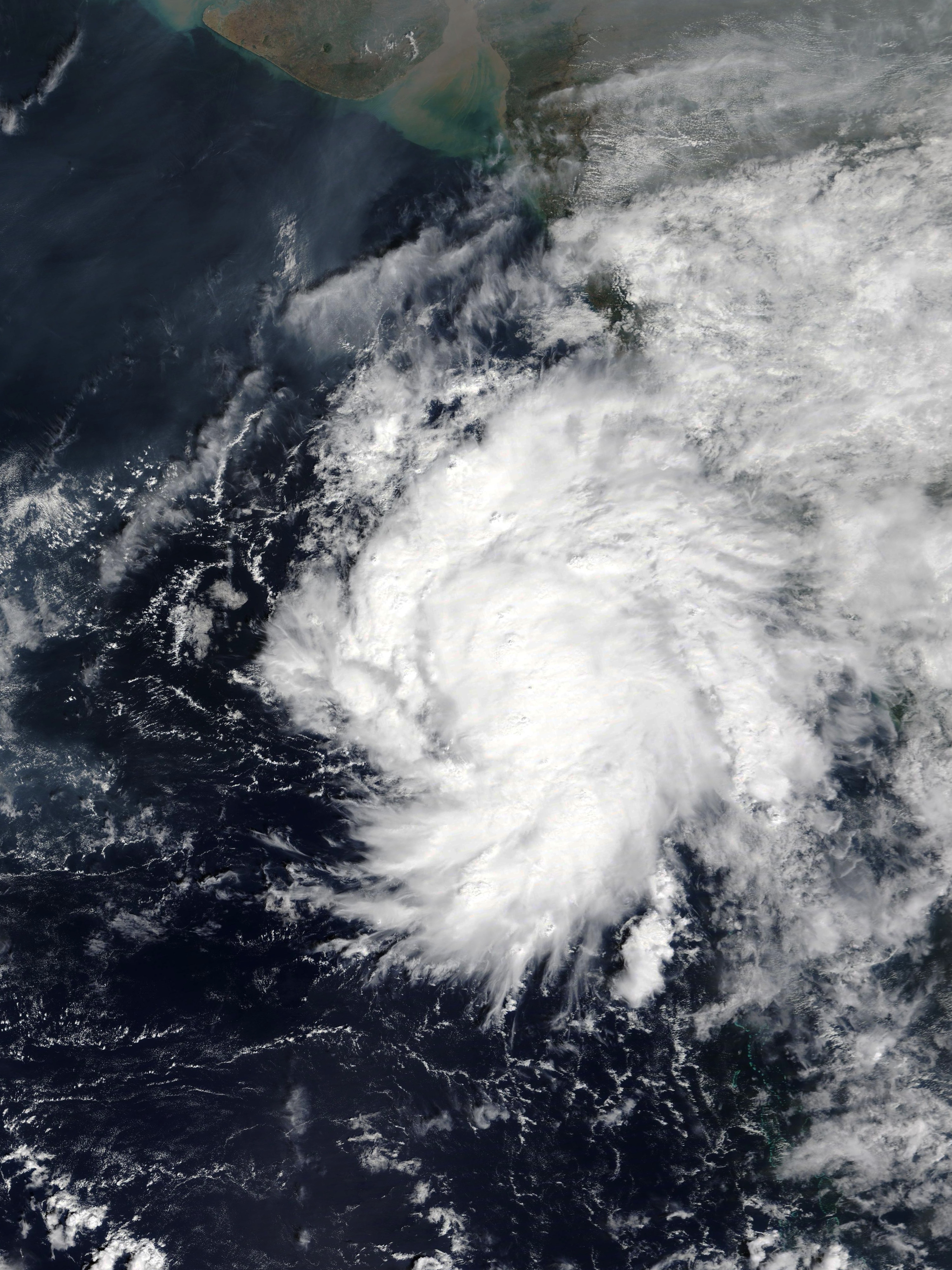
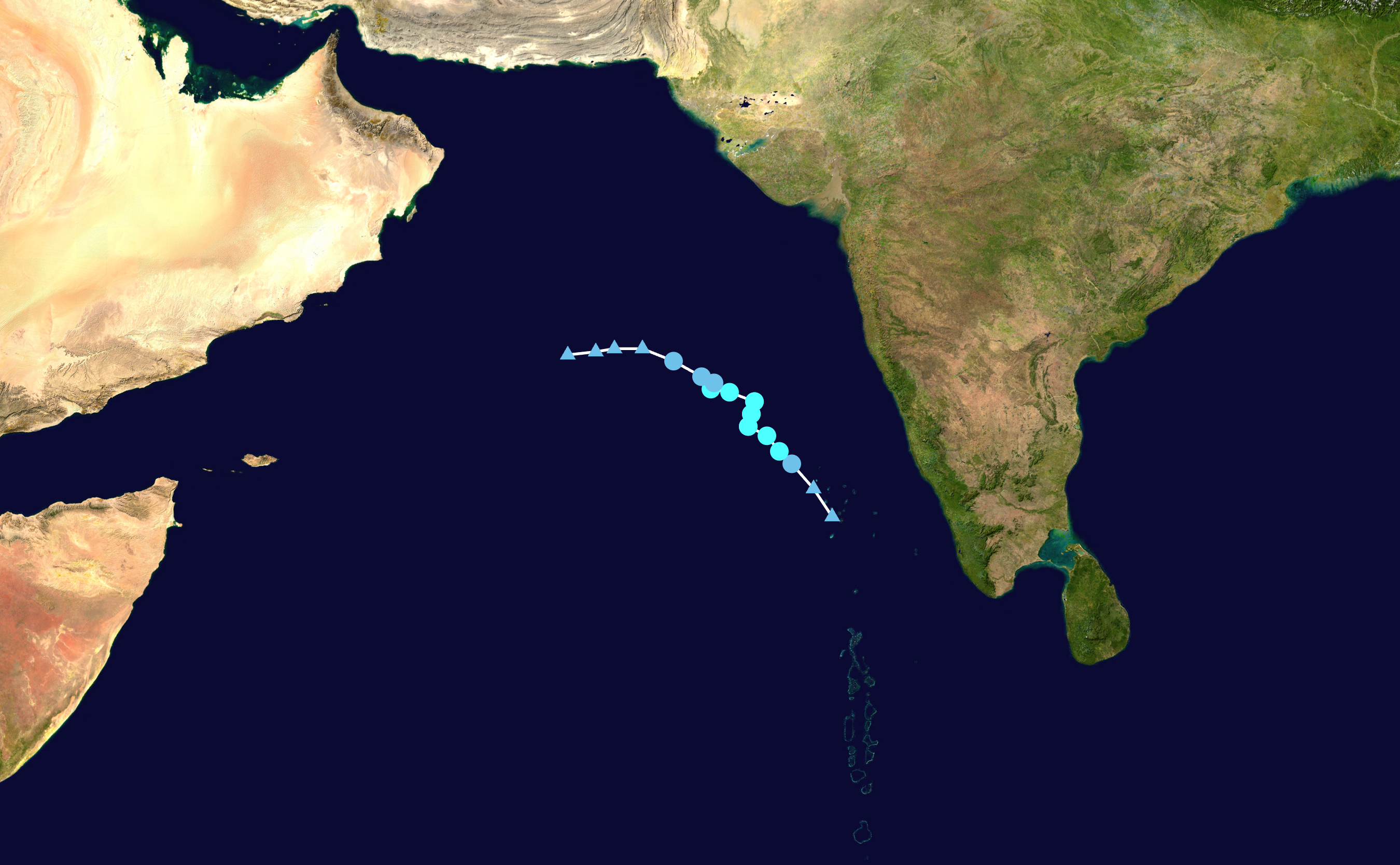
- Duration: December 3 – December 5
- Peak intensity: 55 km/h (35 mph) (3-min); 1000 hPa (mbar)

On December 3, a depression formed over the east-central Arabian Sea, with the IMD marking it as Depression ARB 07. It gradually strengthened into a deep depression soon after. Initial forecasts expected the system to intensify into a cyclonic storm, however, a high amount of wind shear caused it to weaken substantially, and it weakened into a low-pressure area on December 5, west of the Indian coast.

Heavy rains associated with the depression caused extensive flooding in Tamil Nadu. Daily accumulations exceeded 150 mm (5.9 in) in many areas, including 190 mm (7.5 in) in Sathankulam. Officials issued extreme rainfall warnings for six districts and more than 21,500 trained volunteers were placed on standby. The Paravanar River overflowed its banks, flooding an estimated 10,000 homes. A total of 1,305 huts and 465 homes were destroyed across Tamil Nadu. In the night of December 2, three homes collapsed in Mettupalayam killing 17 occupants. Eight other people died in rain-related incidents.

=== Deep Depression ARB 08 ===
- Deep depression (IMD)
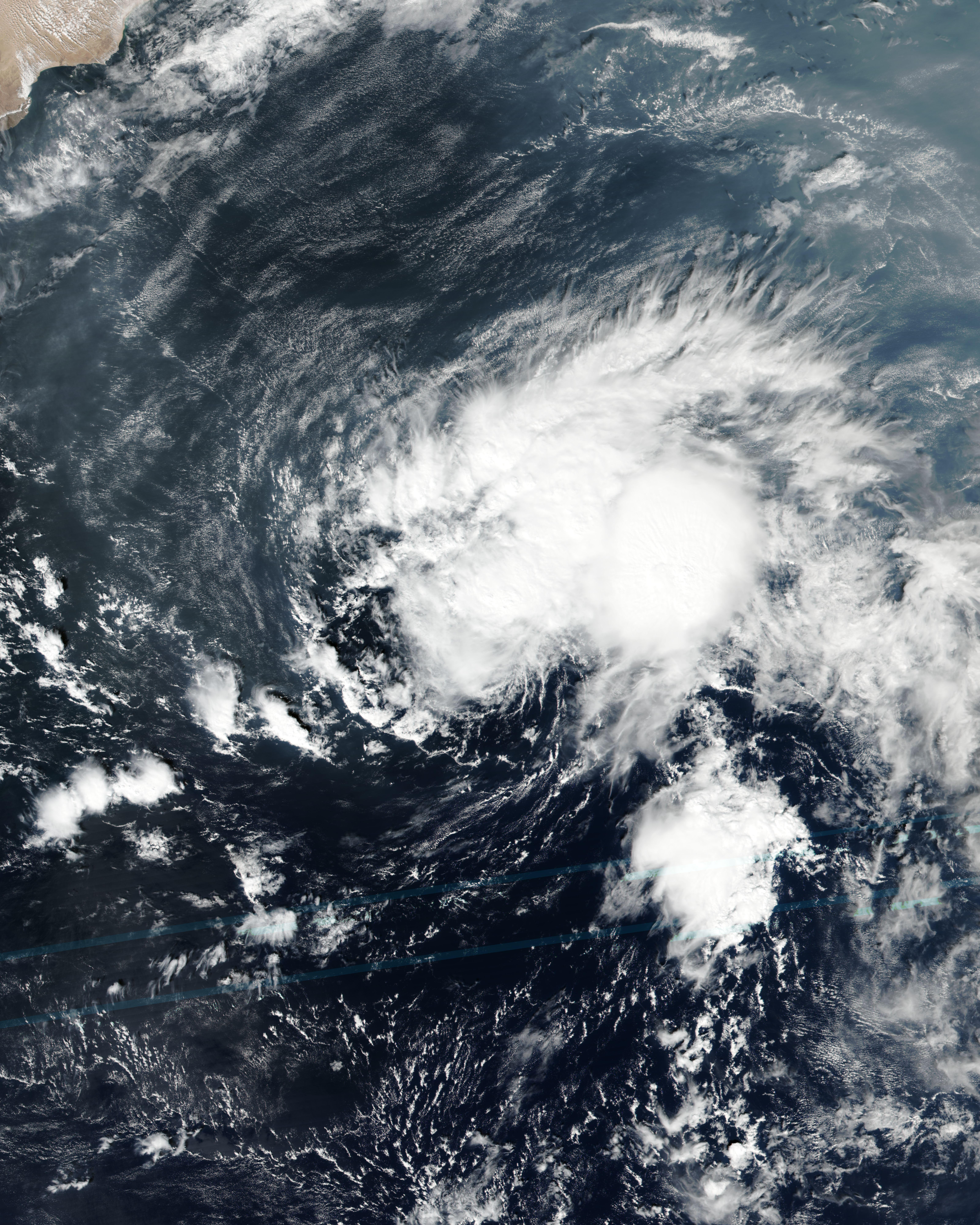
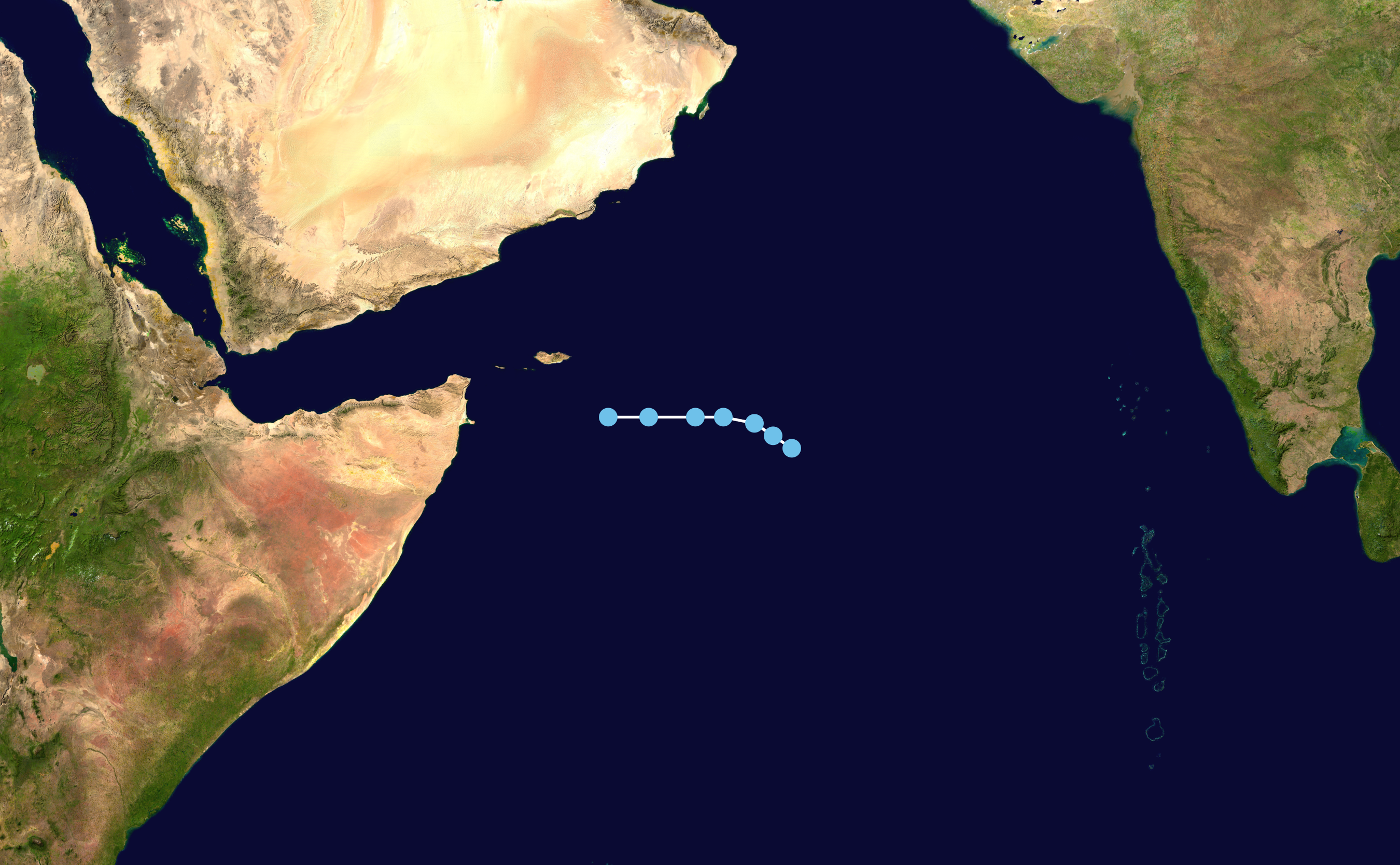
- Duration: December 8 – December 10
- Peak intensity: 55 km/h (35 mph) (3-min); 1000 hPa (mbar)

On December 7, a low pressure area formed over the Equatorial Indian Ocean and the adjoining east-central Arabian Sea. With warm sea surface temperature and high tropical cyclone heat potential, it further developed into a well-marked low pressure system on December 8. Under moderate wind shear, and high sea-surface temperature, it concentrated into a depression with IMD designated as ARB 08 at 09:00 UTC on same day. Satellite imagery indicated an increase of organisation of clouds and an increase of convection around the system center. On December 9, at 00:00 UTC, it further intensified into a deep depression over southwest Arabian Sea, with further organisation of clouds and intense convection around the center. However tropical cyclone heat potential decreased and sea surface temperature also decreased with vertical wind shear started to increase, causing the system to weaken into a depression at 12:00 UTC on December 9. The wind shear have hampered the system and clouds started to disorganise. Similar unfavourable condition further weakened the system and at 06:00 UTC on December 10, IMD would downgrade the system to a well-marked low pressure system over the southwestern Arabian Sea, with satellite imagery showing clouds being increasingly disorganized.

== Storm names ==
In the basin, a tropical cyclone is assigned a name when it is judged to have become a cyclonic storm with winds of 65 kilometres per hour (40 mph). The names were selected by members of the ESCAP/WMO Panel on Tropical Cyclones from 2000 and May 2004, before the Regional Specialized Meteorological Center in New Delhi started to assign names in September 2004. There is no retirement of tropical cyclone names in this basin as the list of names is only scheduled to be used once before a new list of names is drawn up. If a named tropical cyclone moves into the basin from the Western Pacific, it will retain its original name. The names used in the 2019 season are below.

- Fani
- Vayu
- Hikaa
- Kyarr
- Maha
- Bulbul
- Pawan

Pabuk entered the basin from the Gulf of Thailand as a cyclonic storm; its name was assigned by the Japan Meteorological Agency.

== Season effects ==
This is a table of all storms in the 2019 North Indian Ocean cyclone season. It mentions all of the season's storms and their names, duration, peak intensities (according to the IMD storm scale), damage, and death totals. Damage and death totals include the damage and deaths caused when that storm was a precursor wave or extratropical low, and all of the damage figures are in 2019 USD.

Name	Dates	Peak intensity			Areas affected	Damage (USD)	Deaths	Ref(s).
Name	Dates	Category	Wind speed	Pressure	Areas affected	Damage (USD)	Deaths	Ref(s).
Pabuk	January 4–7	Cyclonic storm	85 km/h (53 mph)	998 hPa (29.47 inHg)	Thailand, Myanmar, Andaman Islands	$156 million	8	
Fani	April 26 – May 4	Extremely severe cyclonic storm	215 km/h (134 mph)	932 hPa (27.52 inHg)	Sumatra, Nicobar Islands, Sri Lanka, East India, Bangladesh, Bhutan	$8.1 billion	89	
Vayu	June 10–17	Very severe cyclonic storm	150 km/h (93 mph)	970 hPa (28.64 inHg)	Northern Maldives, India, Southern Pakistan, East Oman	$140,000	8	
BOB 03	August 6–11	Deep depression	55 km/h (34 mph)	988 hPa (29.18 inHg)	East India, Bangladesh	Unknown	3	
Hikaa	September 22–25	Very severe cyclonic storm	140 km/h (87 mph)	972 hPa (28.70 inHg)	Western India, Oman, Saudi Arabia, Yemen	Unknown	5	
LAND 01	September 30 – October 1	Depression	45 km/h (28 mph)	1,004 hPa (29.65 inHg)	Western India	None	None	
Kyarr	October 24 – November 1	Super cyclonic storm	240 km/h (150 mph)	922 hPa (27.23 inHg)	Western India, Oman, Yemen, Somalia	Minor	None	
Maha	October 30 – November 7	Extremely severe cyclonic storm	185 km/h (115 mph)	956 hPa (28.23 inHg)	Sri Lanka, Southern India, Maldives, Western India, Oman	Minor	None	
Bulbul	November 5–11	Very severe cyclonic storm	140 km/h (87 mph)	976 hPa (28.82 inHg)	Myanmar, Andaman and Nicobar Islands, Eastern India, Bangladesh	$3.37 billion	41	
Pawan	December 2–7	Cyclonic storm	75 km/h (47 mph)	998 hPa (29.47 inHg)	Somalia	Unknown	6	
ARB 07	December 3 – 5	Deep depression	55 km/h (34 mph)	1,002 hPa (29.59 inHg)	Tamil Nadu	Unknown	25	
ARB 08	December 8 – 10	Deep depression	55 km/h (34 mph)	1,004 hPa (29.65 inHg)	Socotra, Somalia	None	None	
Season aggregates
12 systems	January 4 – December 10		240 km/h (150 mph)	922 hPa (27.23 inHg)		≥$11.6 billion	185	

== See also ==
- Weather of 2019
- Tropical cyclones in 2019
- 2019 Atlantic hurricane season
- 2019 Pacific hurricane season
- 2019 Pacific typhoon season
- South-West Indian Ocean cyclone seasons: 2018–19, 2019–20
- Australian region cyclone seasons: 2018–19, 2019–20
- South Pacific cyclone seasons: 2018–19, 2019–20
