= 2018 Pacific typhoon season =

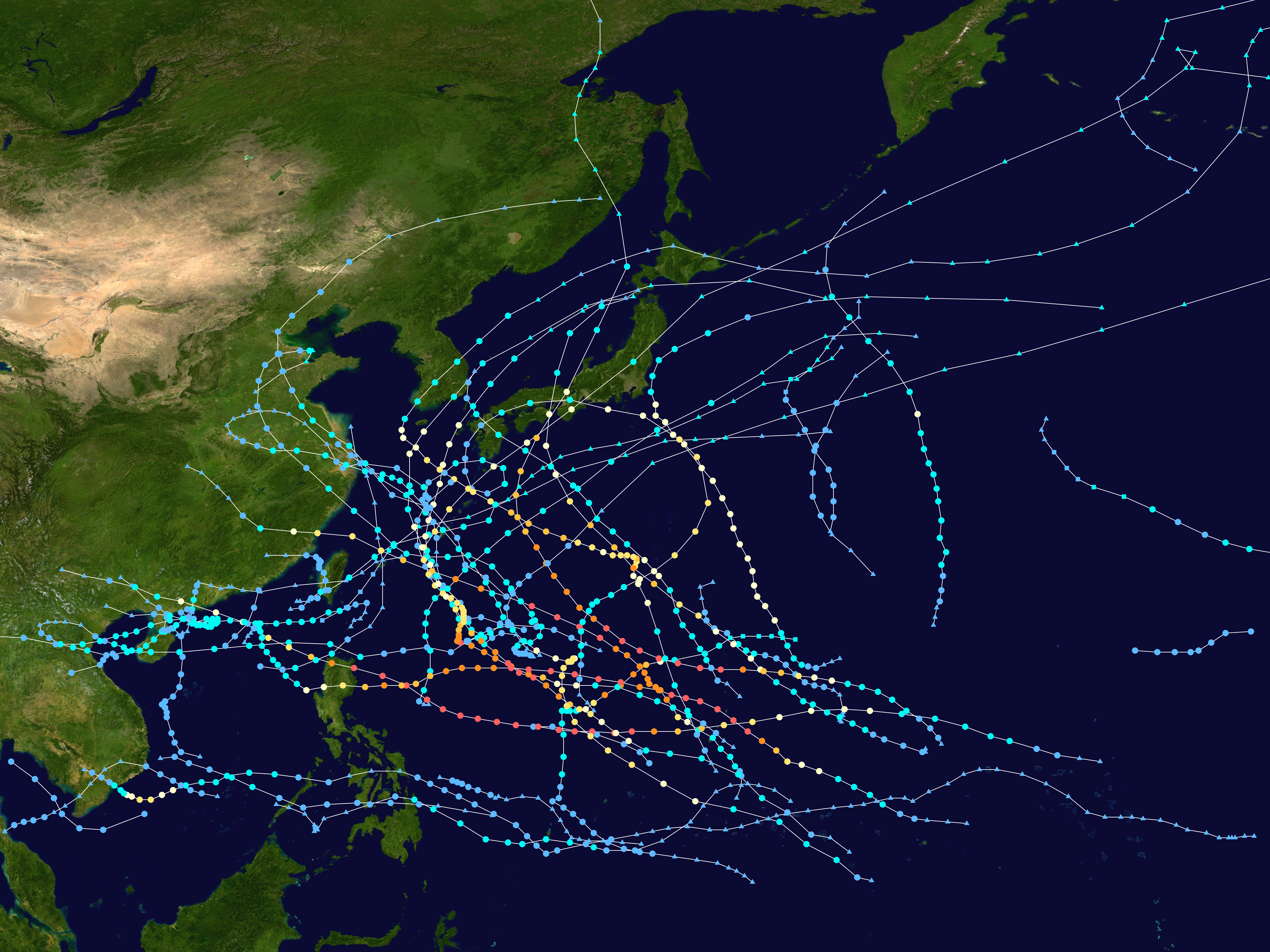
- Season summary map

Seasonal boundaries
- First system formed: December 29, 2017
- Last system dissipated: December 29, 2018

Strongest storm
- Name: Kong-rey & Yutu
  - Maximum winds: 215 km/h (130 mph) (10-minute sustained)
  - Lowest pressure: 900 hPa (mbar)

Seasonal statistics
- Total depressions: 43, 1 unofficial
- Total storms: 29, 1 unofficial
- Typhoons: 13
- Very strong typhoons: 9
- Violent typhoons: 7
- Total fatalities: 793 total
- Total damage: $30.59 billion (2018 USD) (Third-costliest Pacific typhoon season on record)

Related articles
- Timeline of the 2018 Pacific typhoon season; 2018 Atlantic hurricane season; 2018 Pacific hurricane season; 2018 North Indian Ocean cyclone season

The 2018 Pacific typhoon season was at the time, the costliest Pacific typhoon season on record, until the record was beaten by the following year at that time. The season was well above-average, producing twenty-nine storms (including one that crossed over from the Eastern/Central Pacific), thirteen typhoons, seven super typhoons and six Category 5 tropical cyclones, the first such occurrence since 2014. The season ran throughout 2018, though most tropical cyclones typically develop between May and November. The season's first named storm, Bolaven, developed on January 3, while the season's last named storm, Man-yi, dissipated on November 28. The season's first typhoon, Jelawat, reached typhoon status on March 29, and became the first super typhoon of the year on the next day.

The scope of this article is limited to the Pacific Ocean, to the north of the equator between 100°E and the 180th meridian. Within the northwestern Pacific Ocean, there are two separate agencies that assign names to tropical cyclones, which can often result in a cyclone having two names, one from the JMA and one from PAGASA. The Japan Meteorological Agency (JMA) will name a tropical cyclone should it be judged to have 10-minute sustained wind speeds of at least 65 km/h (40 mph) anywhere in the basin, while the Philippine Atmospheric, Geophysical and Astronomical Services Administration (PAGASA) assigns names to tropical cyclones which move into or form as a tropical depression in their area of responsibility located between 135°E and 115°E and between 5°N and 25°N regardless of whether or not a tropical cyclone has already been given a name by the JMA. Tropical depressions that are monitored by the United States' Joint Typhoon Warning Center (JTWC) are given a number with a "W" suffix.

== Seasonal forecasts ==
TSR forecasts Date	Tropical storms	Total Typhoons	Intense TCs	ACE	Ref
Average (1965–2017)	26	16	9	294	
May 11, 2018	27	17	9	307	
July 6, 2018	27	17	10	331	
August 7, 2018	27	17	9	319	
Other forecasts Date	Forecast Center	Period		Systems	Ref
January 15, 2018	PAGASA	January–March		1–3 tropical cyclones	
January 15, 2018	PAGASA	April–June		2–4 tropical cyclones	
March 15, 2018	VNCHMF	January–December		12–13 tropical cyclones	
March 23, 2018	HKO	January–December		5–8 tropical cyclones	
July 13, 2018	PAGASA	July–September		6–8 tropical cyclones	
July 13, 2018	PAGASA	October–December		4–6 tropical cyclones	
2018 season	Forecast Center	Tropical cyclones	Tropical storms	Typhoons	Ref
Actual activity:	JMA	44	29	13	
Actual activity:	JTWC	36	30	16	
Actual activity:	PAGASA	20	15	6	

During the year, several national meteorological services and scientific agencies forecast how many tropical cyclones, tropical storms, and typhoons will form during a season and/or how many tropical cyclones will affect a particular country. These agencies included the Tropical Storm Risk (TSR) Consortium of University College London, PAGASA and Taiwan's Central Weather Bureau. The first forecast of the year was released by PAGASA on January 15, within its seasonal climate outlook for the period January–June. The outlook noted that one to three tropical cyclones were expected between January and March, while two to four were expected to develop or enter the Philippine Area of Responsibility between April and June. PAGASA also mentioned that the La Niña would be short-lived, predicting that it would last until February or April.

On March 15, the Vietnamese National Center for Hydro Meteorological forecasts (VNCHMF) predicted that roughly twelve to thirteen tropical cyclones would affect Vietnam during 2018, which is above average. On March 23, the Hong Kong Observatory predicted that five to eight tropical cyclones would come within 500 kilometres of Hong Kong, which is normal to above normal, with the first tropical cyclone affecting Hong Kong in June or earlier. On May 11, the Tropical Storm Risk (TSR) issued their first forecast for the season, predicting that the 2018 season would be a slightly above average season with 27 named storms, 17 typhoons, and nine intense typhoons. The TSR released their second forecast on July 6, still predicting that the season will be above average, with the only changes to their forecast increasing the number of intense typhoons from 9 to 10. The PAGASA issued their second and final outlook on July 13 for the period of July – December, predicting six to eight tropical cyclones were expected to develop or enter their area of responsibility between July and September, while four to six were forecast during October to December. On August 7, TSR released their final forecast, with its only changes decreasing the numbers of intense typhoons from 10 to 9, as well as decreasing its ACE forecast from 331 units to 319 units.

== Season summary ==
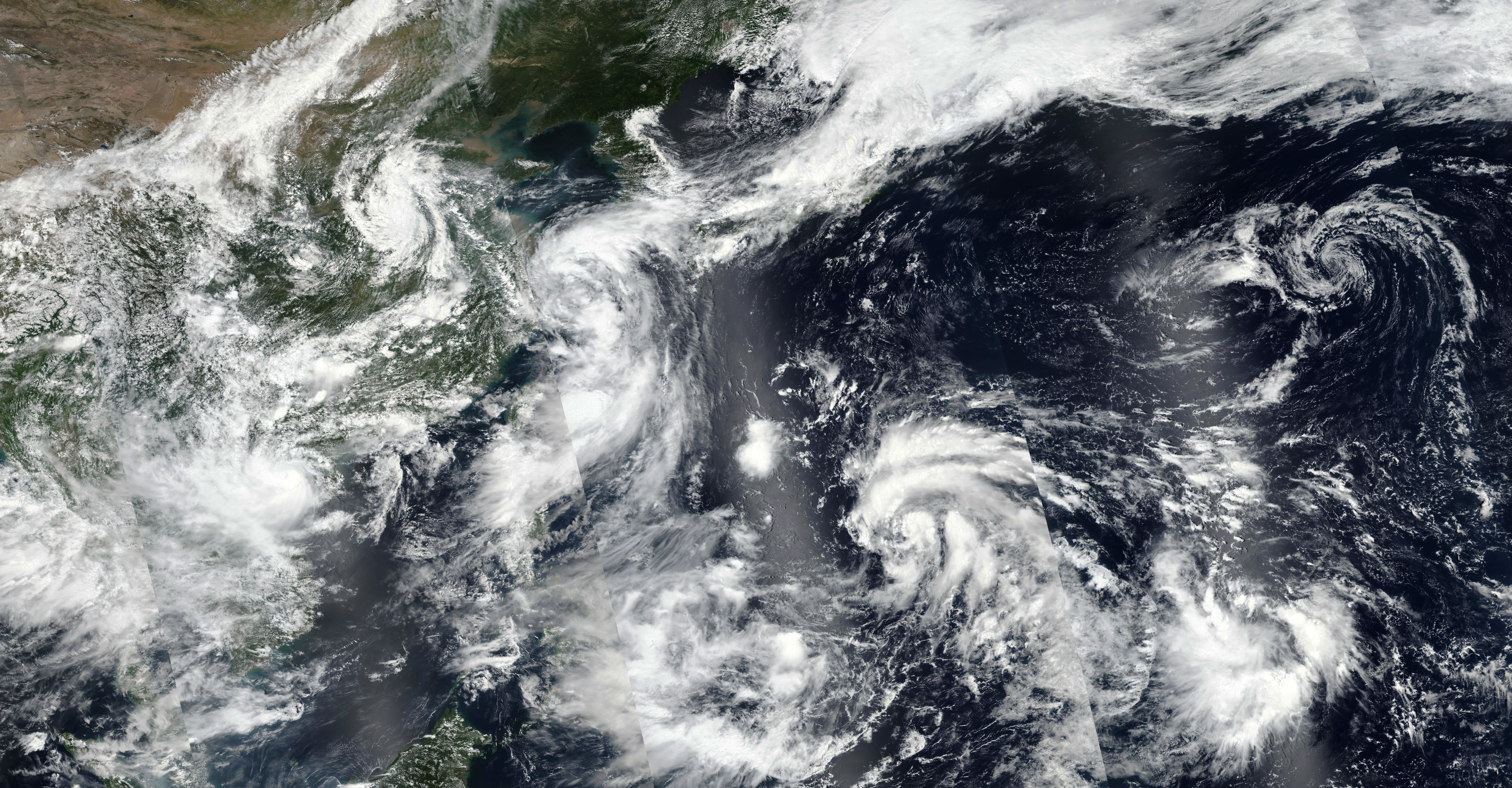
Six tropical cyclones active on August 16: Bebinca (bottom left), Yagi (top left, overland), and Rumbia (center-left) affecting China; Soulik (center-right) and a tropical depression (bottom right, precursor to Cimaron) near the Mariana Islands; and a degenerating Hector (top right) located in the far northwest Pacific

2018 opened with Tropical Depression Agaton active to the east of the Philippines. Over the course of two days, the system moved into the South China Sea and intensified into the first named storm, Bolaven. A month later, Tropical Storm Sanba developed and affected the southern Philippines. About another month later, Tropical Depression 03W formed in the open Pacific and was named Jelawat. Jelawat intensified into the season's first typhoon on March 29, and then the season's first super typhoon. Tropical activity fired up by June, when a series of storms developed, with Tropical Storm Ewiniar making landfall over mainland China. Later that month, Typhoon Prapiroon developed and affected the Korean Peninsula, becoming the first to do so since 2013. Thereafter, Typhoon Maria developed and reached its peak intensity as a Category 5 super typhoon, being the first typhoon to reach that intensity since Typhoon Nock-ten in 2016. Hurricane Hector crossed the International Date Line on August 13, the first to do so since Genevieve in 2014. Systems like Tropical Storms Son-Tinh, Ampil, Josie, Wukong, Jongdari, Shanshan, Yagi, Leepi, Bebinca, and Rumbia formed between late July and early August.

On August 16, Typhoon Soulik developed and headed north, until a Fujiwhara interaction with Typhoon Cimaron (which formed after Soulik) made it head west towards the East China Sea. It later made landfall on South Korea, making it the first typhoon to make landfall on South Korea since Typhoon Chaba in 2016. Cimaron made landfall near Kyoto, Japan on August 23. As Cimaron was nearing landfall, Tropical Depression Luis formed, which made landfall on China and Taiwan. Later that month, Typhoon Jebi developed over the West Pacific and intensified into the third super typhoon of the season.

Costliest known Pacific typhoon seasons
Rank	Total damages	Season
1	$38.54 billion	2019
2	$38.06 billion	2023
3	$30.59 billion	2018
4	$29.62 billion	2024
5	$26.45 billion	2013
6	$21.05 billion	2012
7	$18.77 billion	2004
8	$17.44 billion	1991
9	$17.18 billion	2000
10	$16.96 billion	2016

In September, Typhoon Mangkhut became the fourth super typhoon of the season and made landfall on the island of Luzon in the Philippines. On the same day, Tropical Depression Neneng formed, which later became Tropical Storm Barijat and made landfall on Vietnam. By late September, Typhoon Trami (Paeng) formed, becoming the 5th super typhoon of 2018. While Typhoon Trami was in the Western Pacific, nearing Okinawa with winds of 165 km/h (103 mph), Tropical Depression 30W formed, and was named Kong-rey by the JMA after strengthening into a tropical storm. It intensified into a super typhoon on October 2, becoming the 5th Category 5 super typhoon. Later on in the month, it was followed by the sixth and final Category 5-equivalent storm of the season, Yutu.

== Systems ==
=== Tropical Storm Bolaven (Agaton) ===
- Tropical storm (JMA)
- Tropical storm (SSHWS)
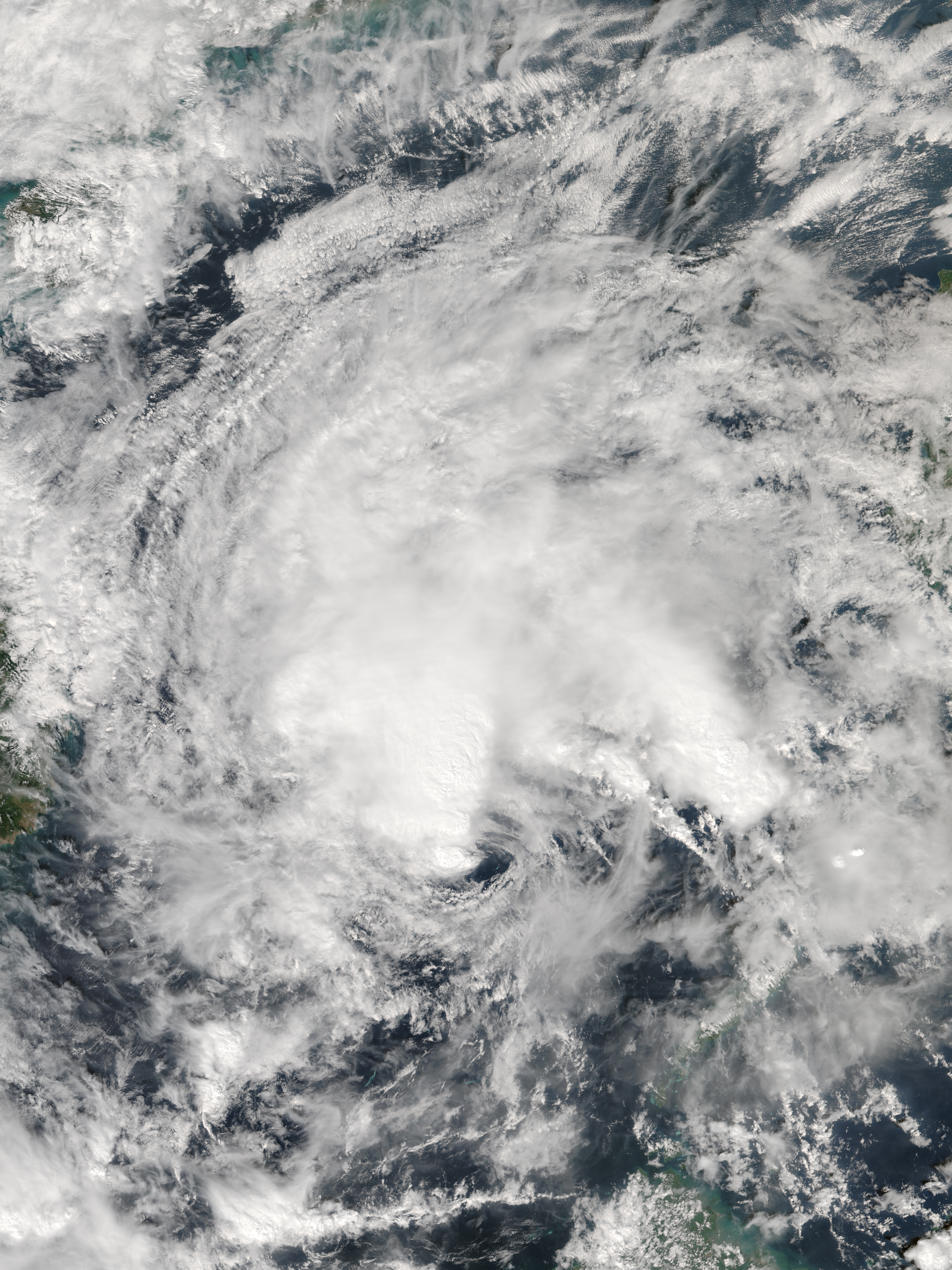
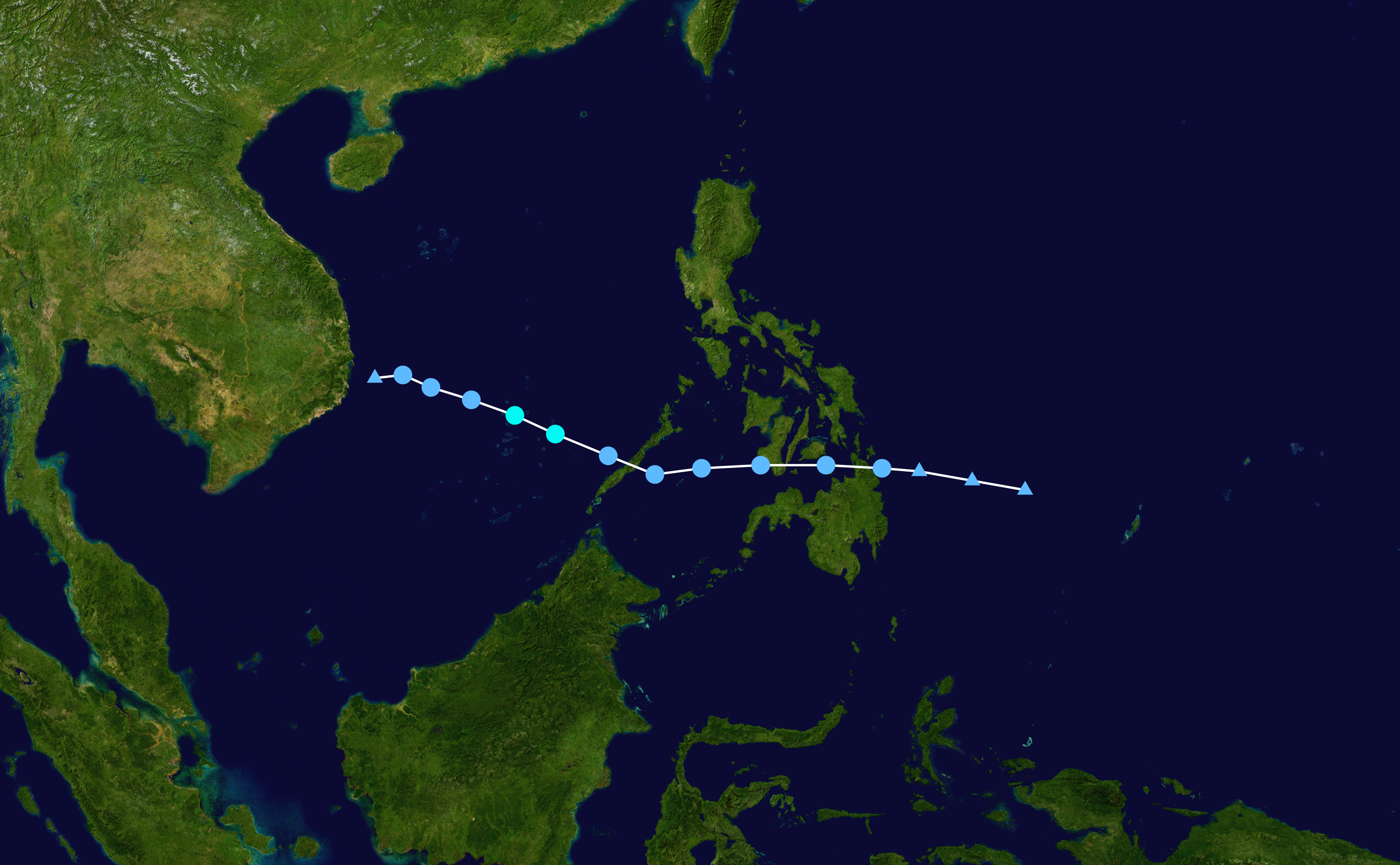
- Duration: December 29, 2017 – January 4, 2018
- Peak intensity: 65 km/h (40 mph) (10-min); 1002 hPa (mbar)

A low-pressure area developed into a tropical depression northeast of Palau on December 29, 2017. The system moved generally westward, and on the first day of 2018, the PAGASA began issuing advisories on the system and locally named it Agaton. Both the JMA and the JTWC followed suit, with the latter designating the system as 01W. The depression reached the Philippines on January 1, making landfall over Bucas Grande at 17:00 UTC, then at Claver, Surigao del Norte at 17:15 UTC. The system crossed the Bohol Sea before making a third landfall near Jagna, Bohol at 20:00 UTC, a fourth in Santander, Cebu at 21:00 UTC, and a final landfall at Bais, Negros Oriental at 23:30 UTC. By January 3, the system had intensified into a tropical storm according to the JMA and was named Bolaven, thus becoming the first named storm of the season. However, several hours later, Bolaven started to weaken and rapidly deteriorate. The system was last tracked by the JMA to the east of Vietnam on January 4.

The impact caused by Bolaven (Agaton) was moderate but not as significant as the previous two systems, Kai-tak and Tembin, with about 2,000 passengers stranded in ports in the Visayas. As of January 22, three people have been reported killed by the storm, while total damages were up to Ph₱554.7 million (US$11.1 million).

=== Tropical Storm Sanba (Basyang) ===
- Tropical storm (JMA)
- Tropical storm (SSHWS)
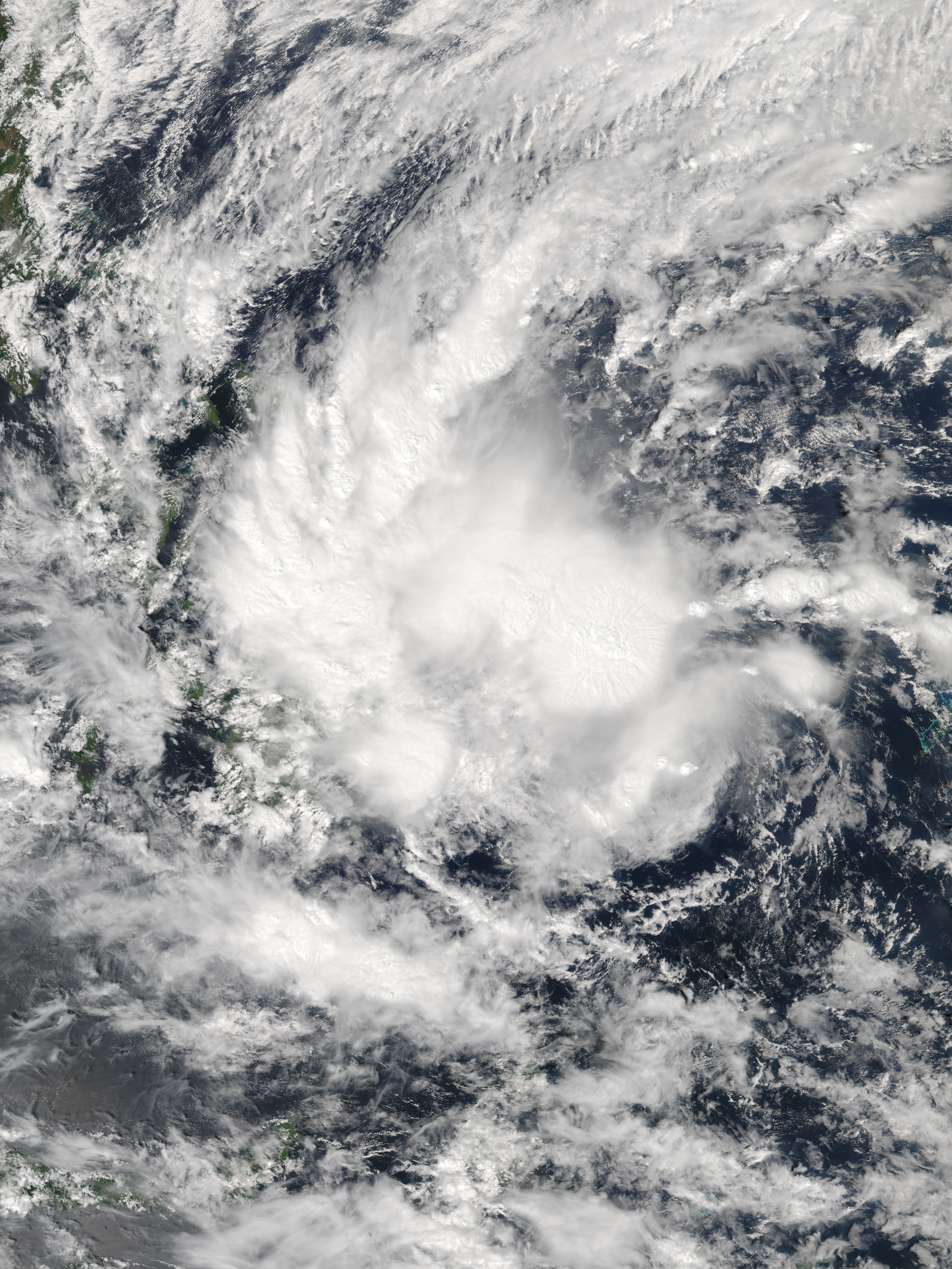
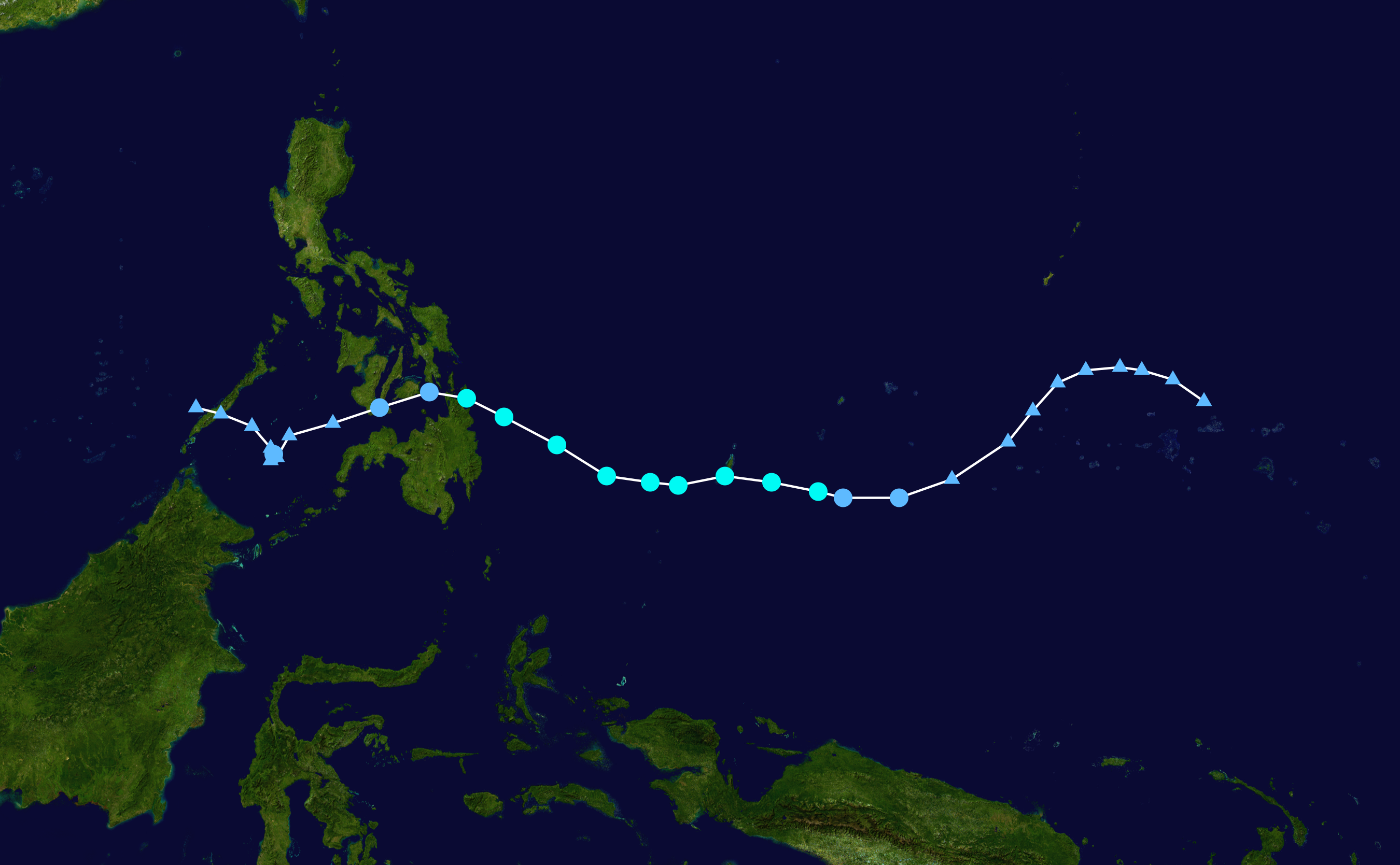
- Duration: February 8 – February 16
- Peak intensity: 65 km/h (40 mph) (10-min); 1000 hPa (mbar)

A low-pressure system developed into a tropical depression north of Chuuk early on February 8. It developed into a tropical storm on February 11, receiving the international name Sanba by the JMA. Shortly afterwards, Sanba entered the Philippine area of responsibility and was assigned the local name Basyang by the PAGASA. On February 13, Sanba made landfall on Cortes, Surigao Del Sur, causing it to weaken to a tropical depression. On the next day, the system weakened into a remnant low as it made another landfall in Surigao del Sur.

A total of 1,660 houses were damaged, of which 429 were completely destroyed; most of the homes damaged were in Caraga. Siargao Island, Silay City, Carmen municipality in Bohol, and the municipalities of Culaba and Kawayan in Biliran were affected by power outages from February 12 to 13. Twenty-two roads and eight bridges were damaged by floods and landslides. Two boats carrying people capsized: a fishing boat near Silago, Southern Leyte, and a passenger vessel en route to Homonhon. All four on board the two boats survived. Approximately 17,000 people were affected by the storm and there were 14 fatalities. Total agricultural damages were at Php 168 million (US$3.23 million), mostly coming from flooded rice fields.

=== Typhoon Jelawat (Caloy) ===
- Violent typhoon (JMA)
- Category 4 super typhoon (SSHWS)
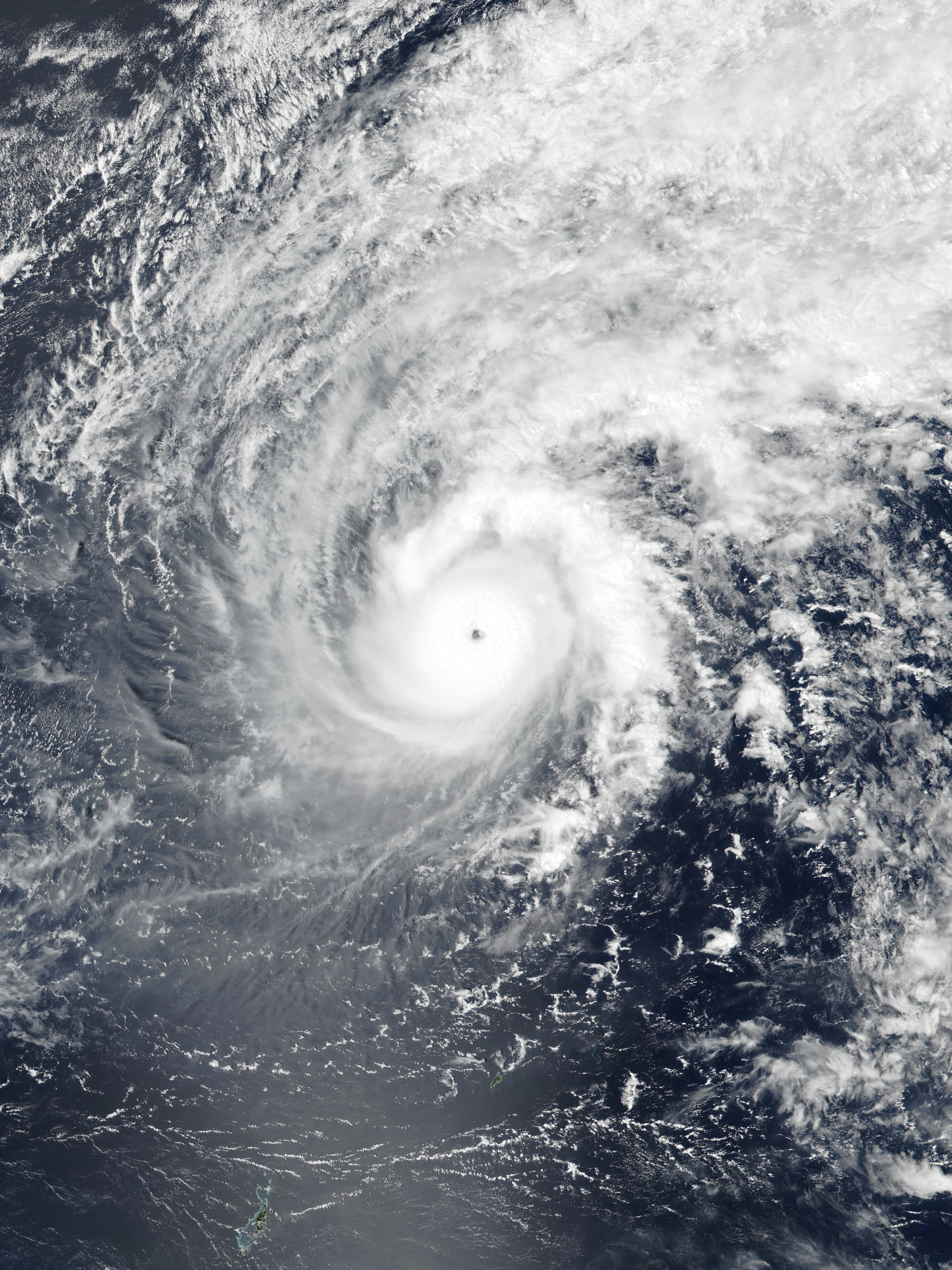
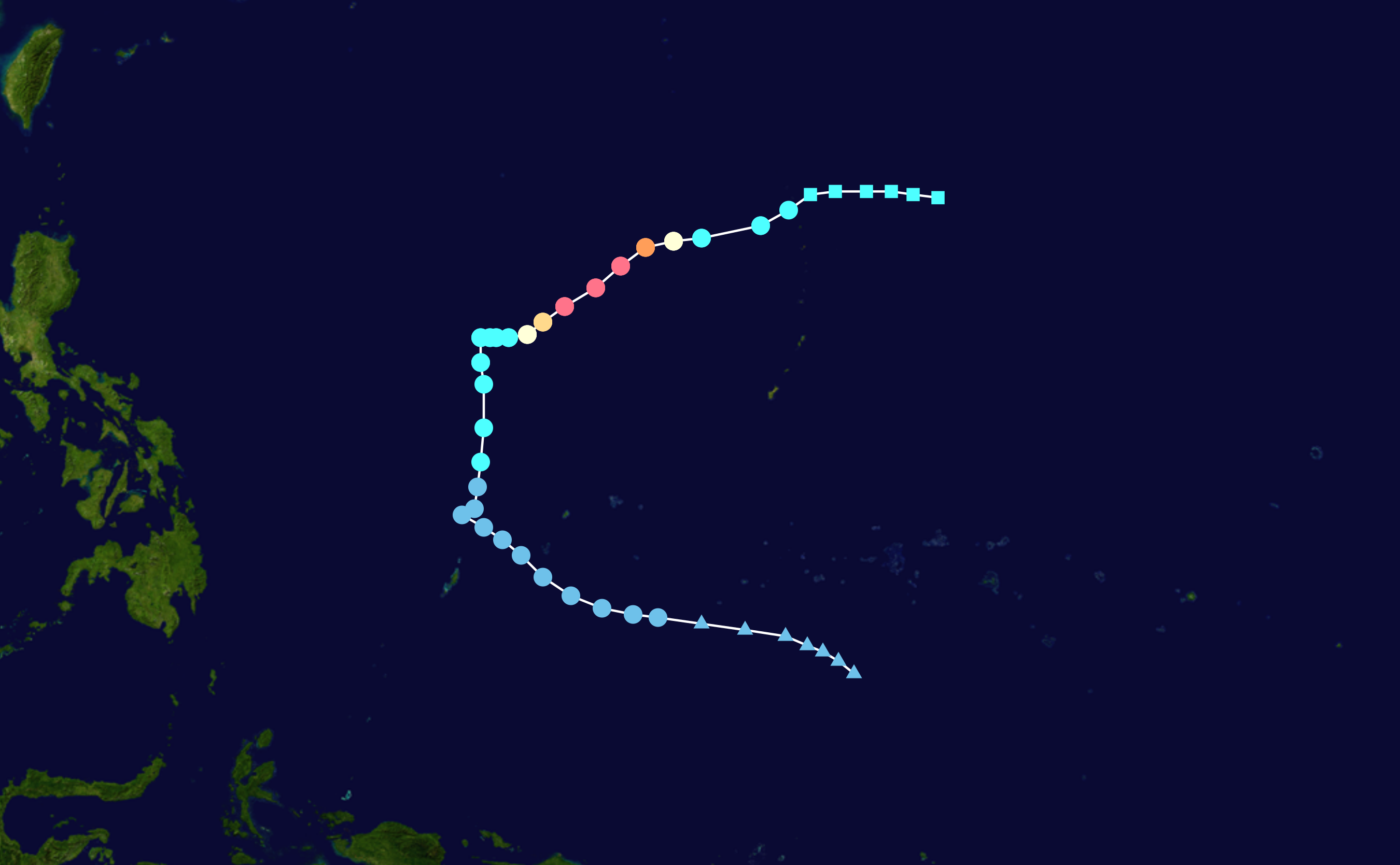
- Duration: March 24 – April 1
- Peak intensity: 195 km/h (120 mph) (10-min); 915 hPa (mbar)

On March 24, a tropical depression formed to the south of the Mariana Islands, and the JTWC assigned it the numerical identifier 03W. On March 25, the system intensified into a tropical storm and was named Jelawat by the JMA, and at the same time it entered PAGASA's Philippine Area of Responsibility (PAR) and was assigned the local name Caloy. Due to strong southwesterly wind shear, the cyclone remained poorly organized, with disorganized convection near an exposed low-level circulation. Conditions gradually became more favorable for further development, resulting in Jelawat steadily strengthening and gaining organization before intensifying into a severe tropical storm at 18:00 UTC on March 28. Later on March 29, an eye began to emerge within a growing central dense overcast, leading to the JMA classifying it as a typhoon at 00:00 UTC on March 29. Explosive intensification then ensued over the following 36 hours as the eye became sharply defined, and Jelawat attained its peak intensity later that morning, with estimated 10-minute sustained winds of 195 km/h (121 mph) and a central pressure of 915 hPa (27.0 inHg). At the same time, the JTWC assessed it as peaking with 1-minute sustained winds of 240 km/h (150 mph), making it a Category 4 super typhoon.

Immediately after peaking in intensity, Jelawat began weakening rapidly due to a sharp increase in wind shear and dry air, and the storm fell below typhoon strength late on March 31. During the next couple of days, Jelawat drifted to the northeast and then turned eastward before dissipating on April 1.

Jelawat yielded 20 inches of rainfall on parts of the island of Pohnpei, resulting in flooding and landslides that caused critical damage to infrastructure and one death. A woman in Guam drowned from the remnants of Jelawat on April 3, after strong surf and rip currents stranded her in water.

=== Tropical Depression 04W ===
- Tropical depression (JMA)
- Tropical storm (SSHWS)
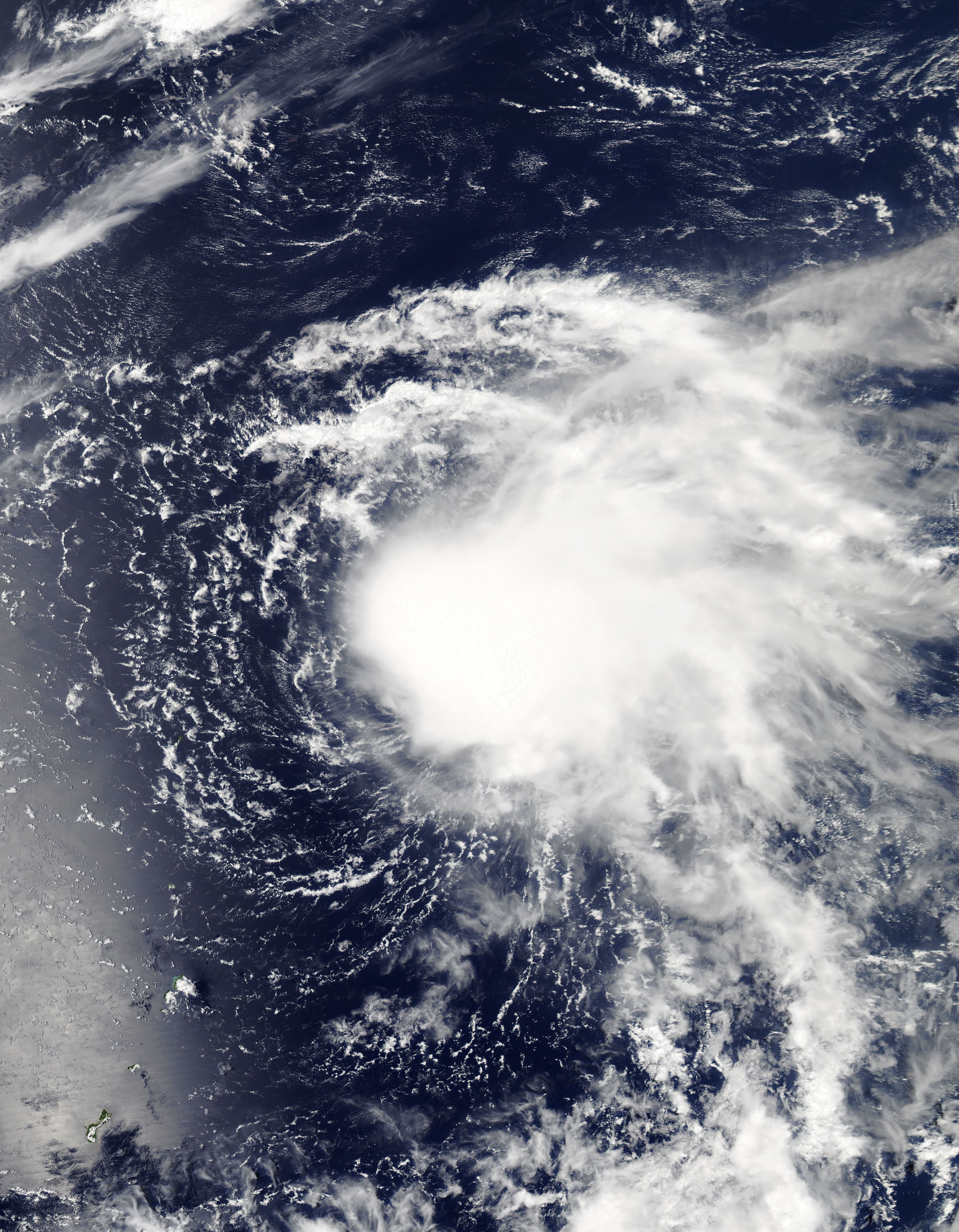
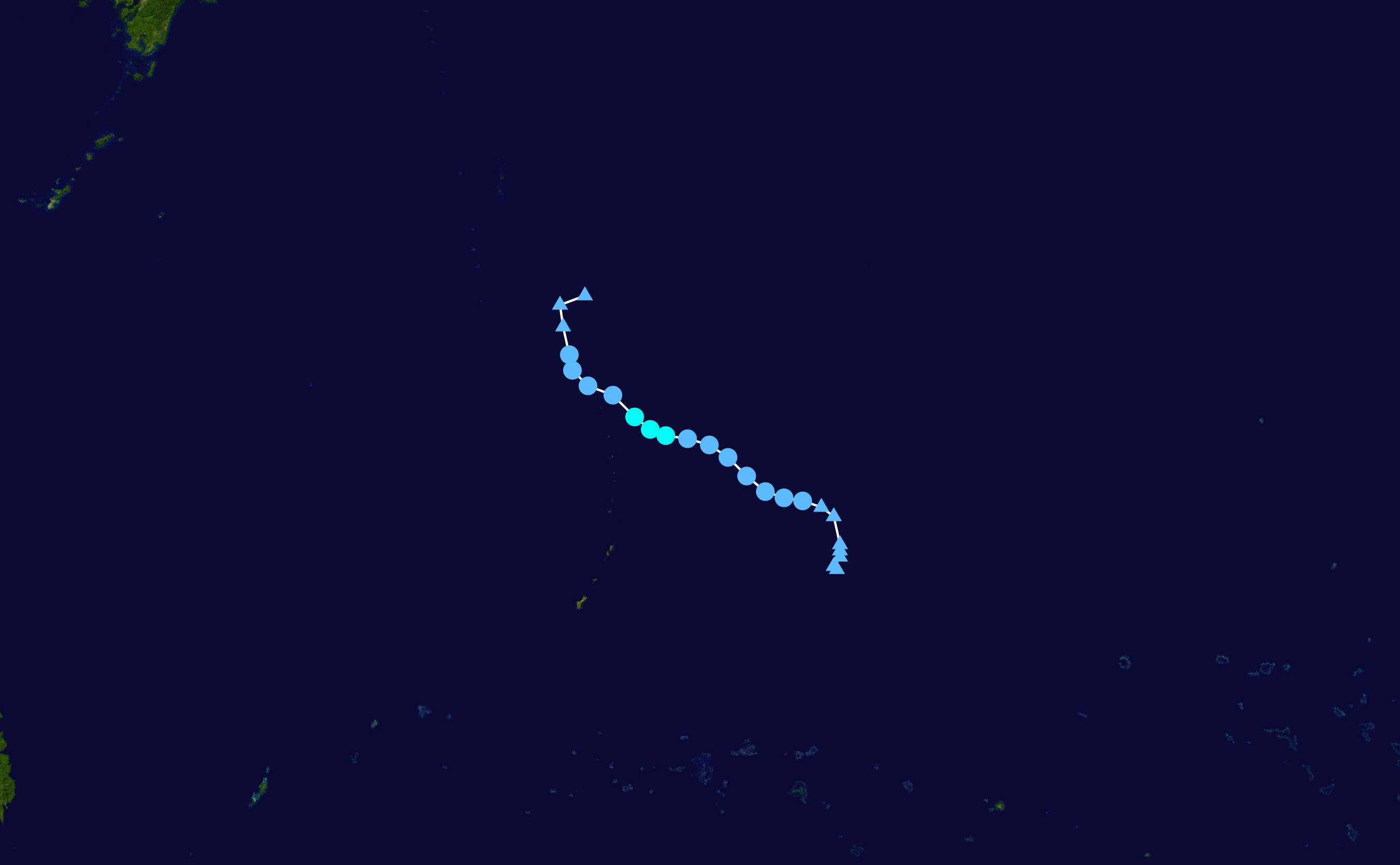
- Duration: May 10 – May 15
- Peak intensity: 55 km/h (35 mph) (10-min); 1008 hPa (mbar)

A low-pressure area east of Mariana Islands was upgraded to a tropical depression by the JMA late on May 10 shortly before the JTWC issued a TCFA. By May 12, deep convection was observed near its center as the JTWC began issuing advisories on the system, giving it the designation 04W. Roughly twelve hours later, it was reported that 04W had intensified into a tropical storm by the JTWC after satellite imagery had depicted a well-defined center. Tracking on a west-northwesterly course, the system began to weaken as it entered an area of unfavorable conditions. 04W rapidly weakened as the JTWC issued their final advisory on the system early on May 14 as wind shear affected the system and exposed the elongated low-level circulation. The JMA, however, tracked the system until early on May 15, when it dissipated.

=== Tropical Storm Ewiniar ===
- Tropical storm (JMA)
- Tropical storm (SSHWS)
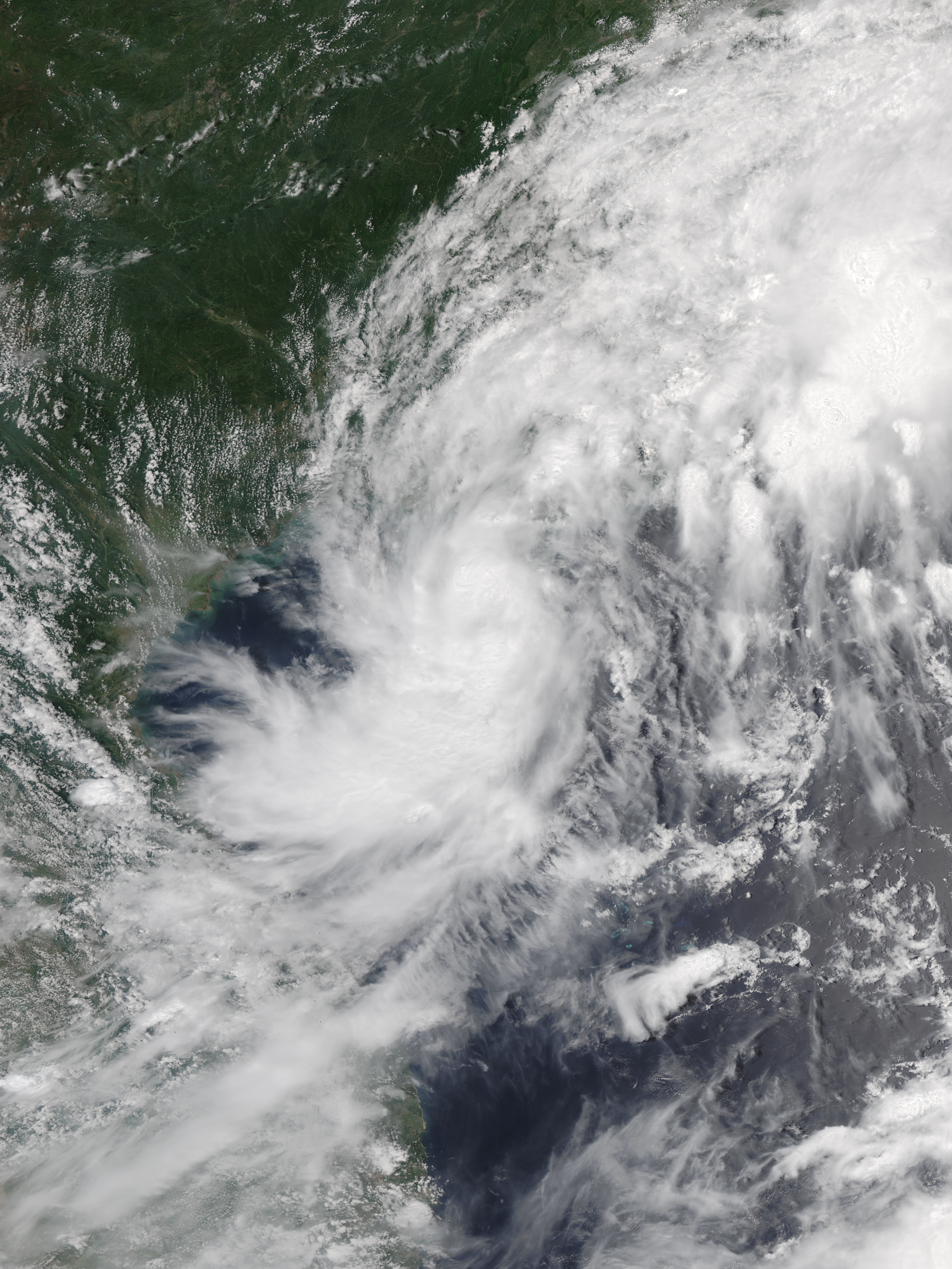
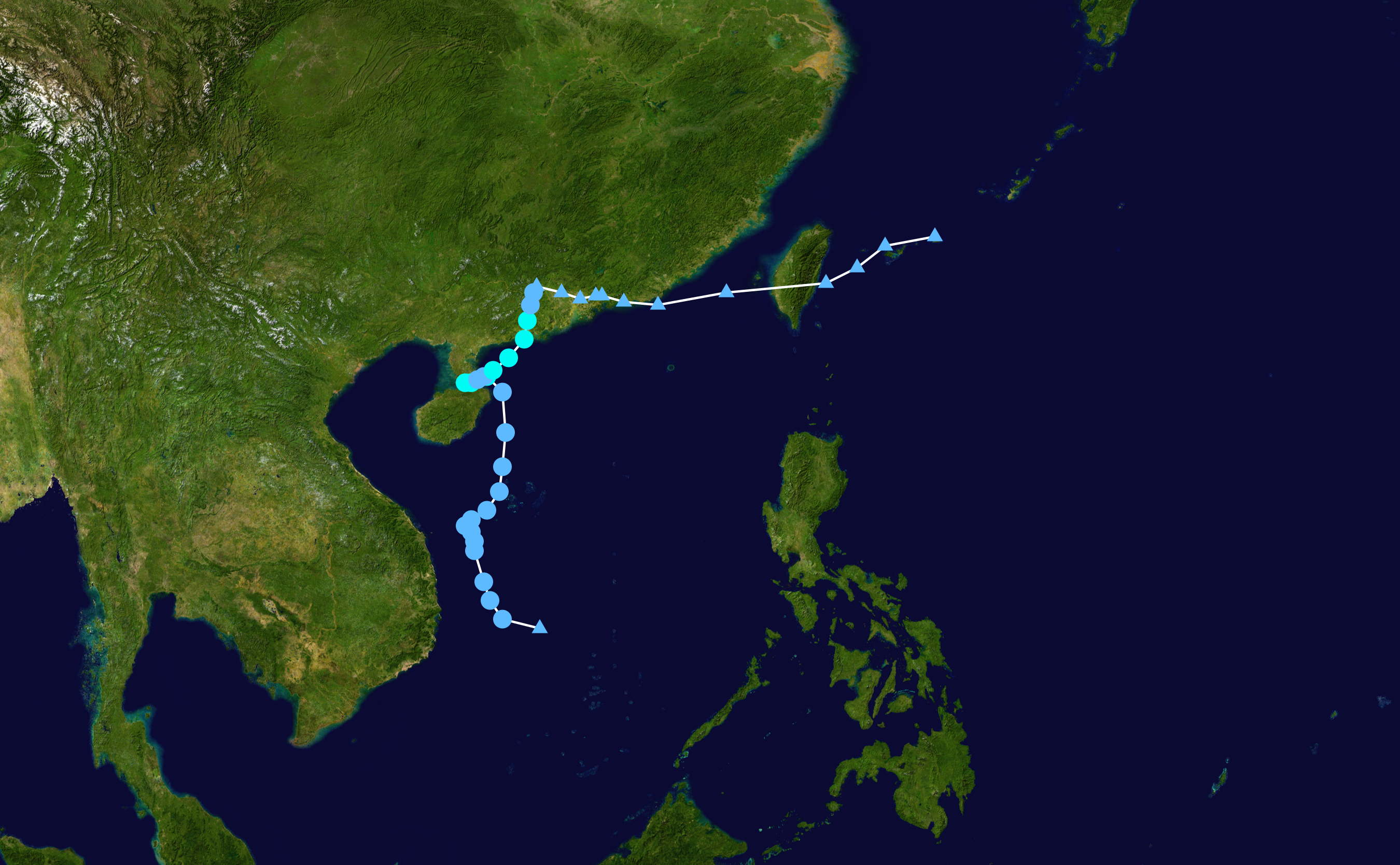
- Duration: June 2 – June 9
- Peak intensity: 75 km/h (45 mph) (10-min); 998 hPa (mbar)

A low-pressure area developed into a tropical depression over the South China Sea on June 2. Later that day, the JTWC followed suit and assigned the designation 05W to the system. 05W meandered in a westward direction until it curved northward, and after three days, the JTWC upgraded the system to a tropical storm. The JMA did the same three hours later early on June 6, naming it Ewiniar. Shortly thereafter, Ewiniar made landfall over South China. Ewiniar maintained its intensity while over land until the JTWC issued its final advisory late on June 7. The JMA, however, tracked the system until early on June 9, when Ewiniar had weakened into a tropical depression and degenerated into a remnant low. However, Ewiniar's remnants moved out to sea and continued to persist, before dissipating on June 13.

A total of 13 people were killed, while total damages in mainland China were counted to be ¥5.19 billion (US$812 million).

=== Severe Tropical Storm Maliksi (Domeng) ===
- Severe tropical storm (JMA)
- Tropical storm (SSHWS)
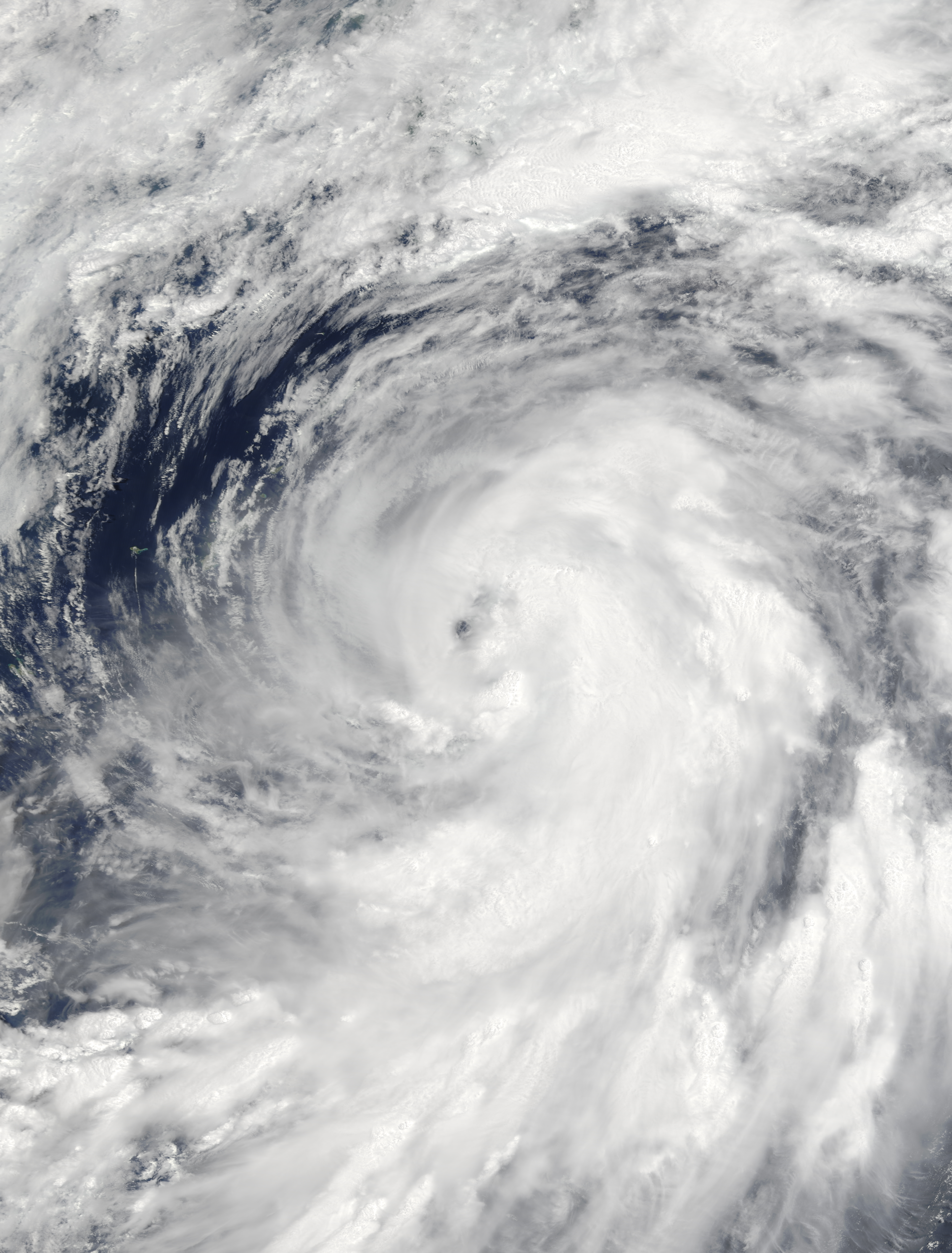
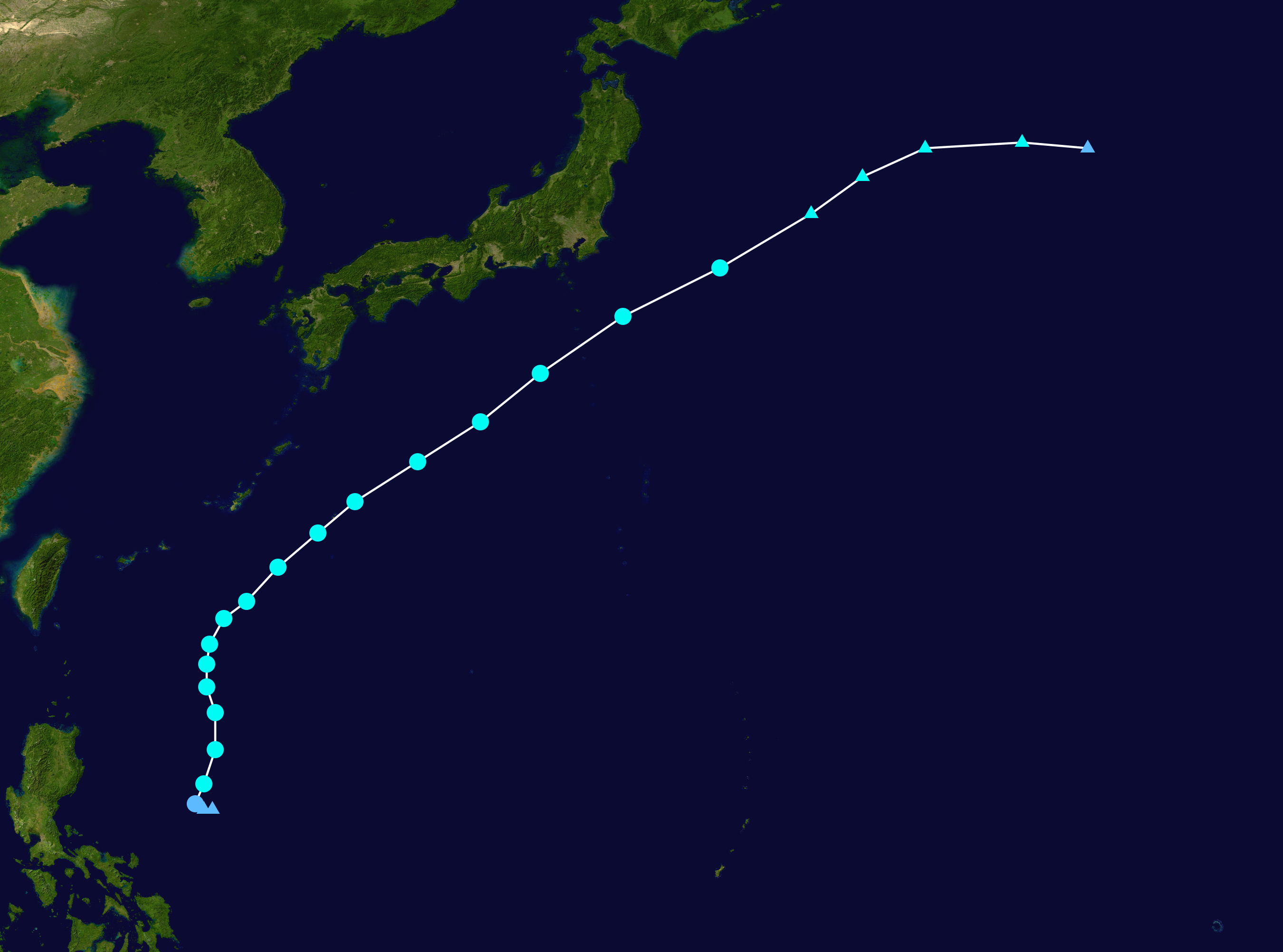
- Duration: June 3 – June 11
- Peak intensity: 110 km/h (70 mph) (10-min); 970 hPa (mbar)

A low-pressure area northwest of Palau developed into a tropical depression late on June 3. On the next day, the system received the local name Domeng from the PAGASA as the JTWC issued a TCFA on the system. After the system had consolidated further, the JMA upgraded the system to a tropical storm, naming it Maliksi (1805). The JTWC, however, did not track the system until 03:00 UTC on June 8 when it gave Maliksi the designation of 06W. Moving northward, Maliksi continued to intensify until it reached its peak strength early on June 10 with winds of 110 km/h (68 mph), just shy of typhoon intensity, and a minimum pressure of 970 hPa. Operationally, the JMA briefly classified Maliksi as a typhoon, but it was downgraded to a severe tropical storm in post-analysis. Maliksi began to weaken as it began extratropical transition, and on June 11 as it encountered more unfavorable conditions, both agencies stopped issuing warnings on Maliksi as the system's center became exposed and as it transitioned into an extratropical cyclone. The JMA tracked the remnants of Maliksi until 00:00 UTC on June 13.

Despite not making landfall on the Philippines, Maliksi prompted the PAGASA to declare the official start of the rainy season on June 8, 2018. Two people were killed by heavy monsoonal rains enhanced by Maliksi in the Philippines.

=== Subtropical Storm 07W ===
- Subtropical storm (SSHWS)
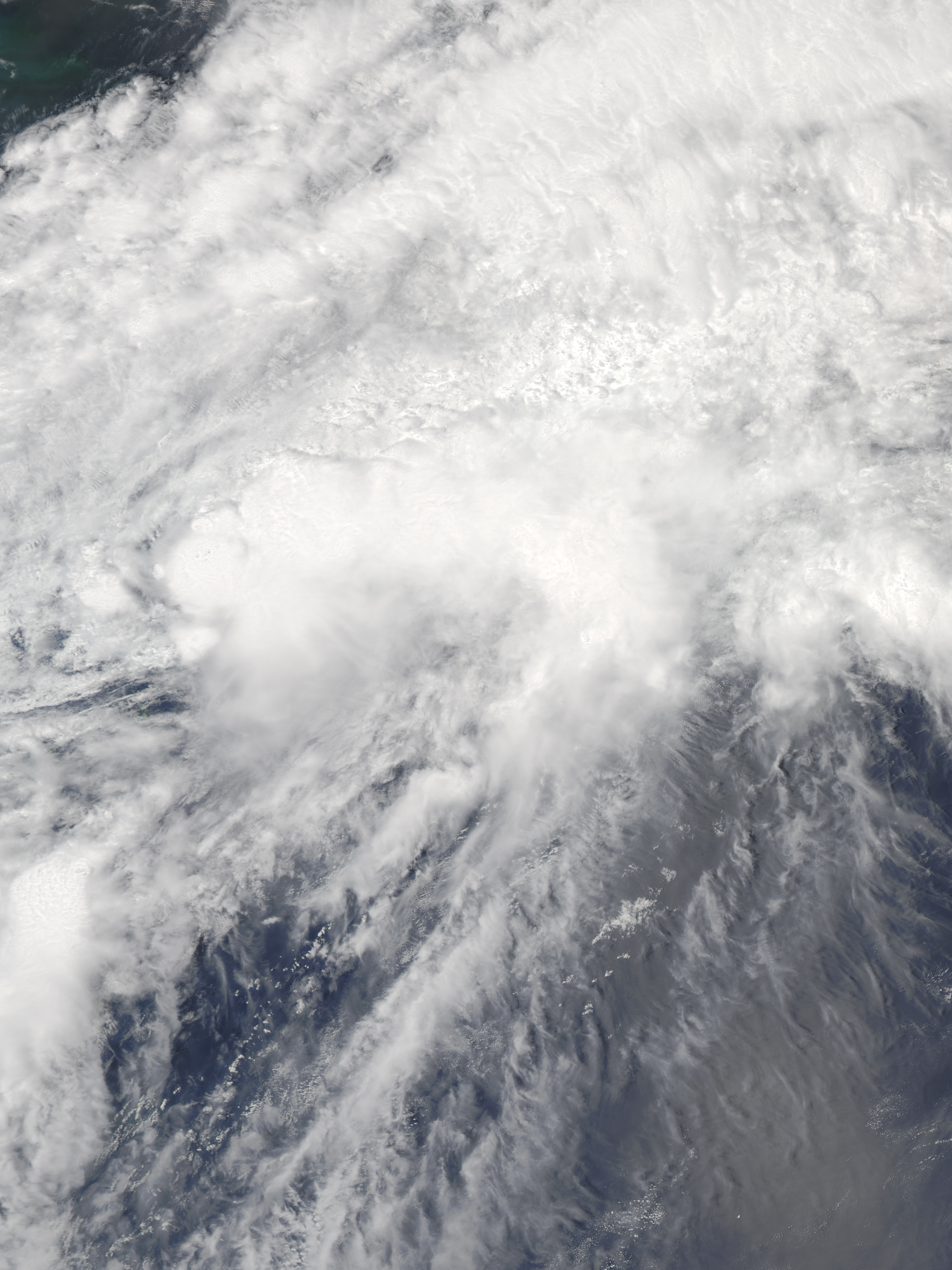
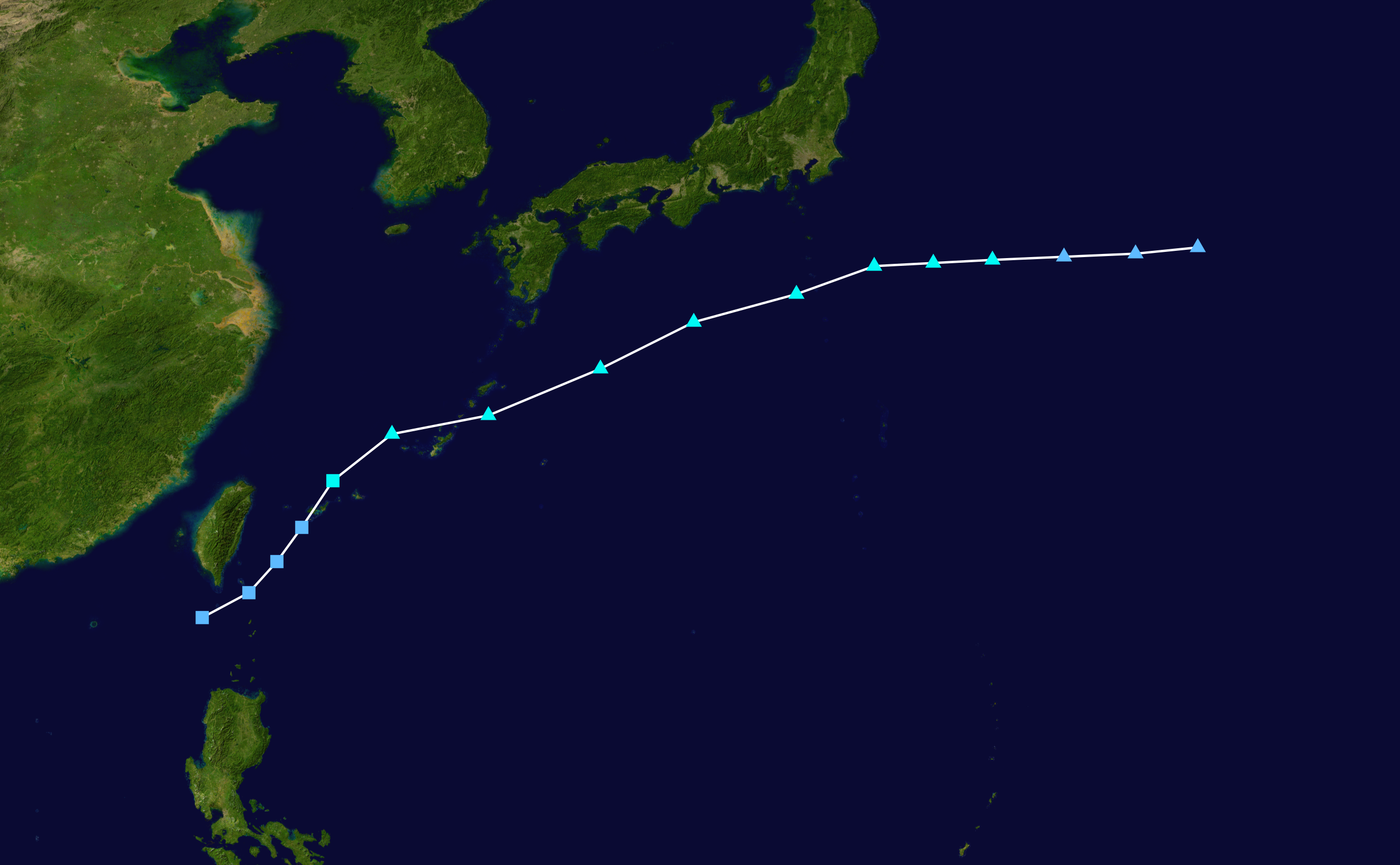
- Duration: June 13 – June 15
- Peak intensity: 65 km/h (40 mph) (1-min); 996 hPa (mbar)

A disturbance formed southwest of Taiwan on June 12 just within the meiyu front, and the JTWC subsequently indicated the formation of a subtropical depression. At 21:00 UTC on June 13, the JTWC issued its first advisory on the system and designated it as 07W, classifying it as a tropical depression. Despite being affected by moderate to severe wind shear, the system was located over relatively warm sea-surface temperatures as it produced patches of convection, and this prompted the JTWC to upgrade 07W to a tropical storm. The JTWC later issued their fourth but final advisory on 07W at 15:00 UTC on June 14 when the system was rapidly undergoing a phase of extratropical transition and as the system was rapidly losing its structure. 07W fully became an extratropical cyclone just to the south of mainland Japan at 06:00 UTC on June 15, although its remnant was still tracked until June 25, when the system was last located near the coast of British Columbia.

=== Tropical Storm Gaemi (Ester) ===
- Tropical storm (JMA)
- Tropical storm (SSHWS)
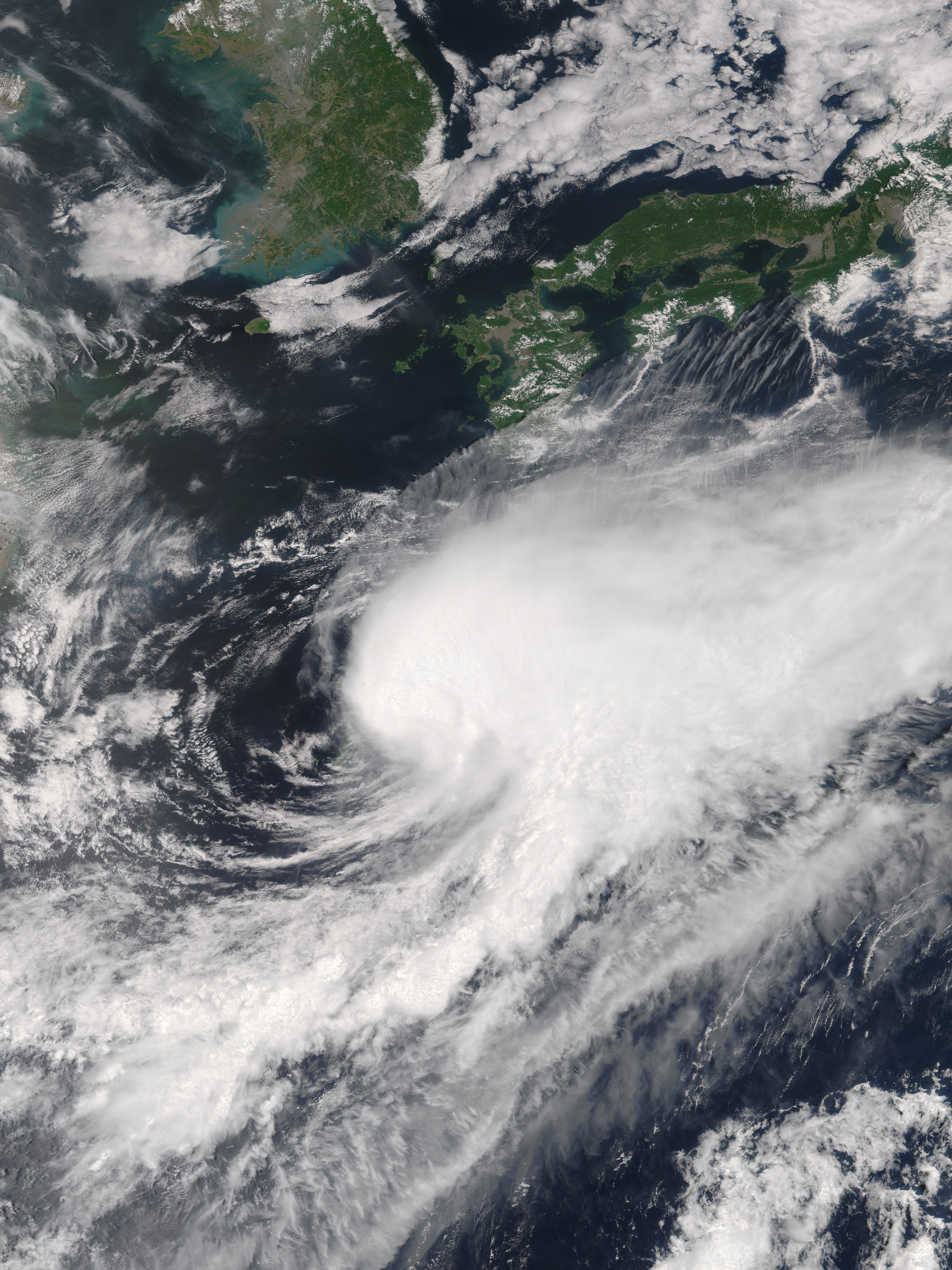
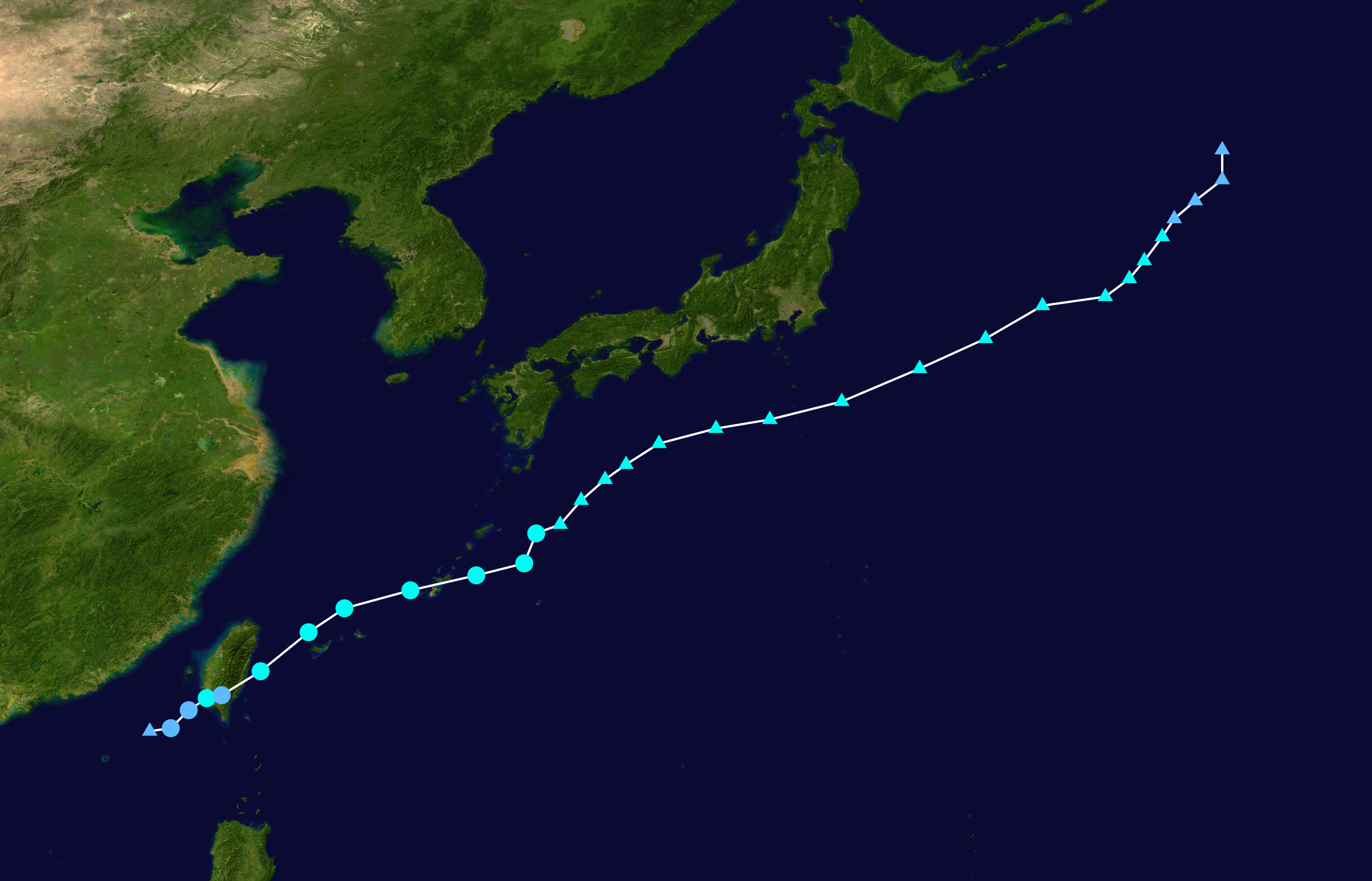
- Duration: June 13 – June 17
- Peak intensity: 85 km/h (50 mph) (10-min); 990 hPa (mbar)

On June 13, a tropical depression formed on the South China Sea from the trough of 07W. Tracking east-northeastward on June 14, the PAGASA announced it had entered the Philippine Area of Responsibility at 16:00 UTC, receiving the local name Ester. Tropical Depression Ester (08W) made landfall on Kaohsiung, Taiwan by midnight, and after emerging off the coast, assigned the name Gaemi by the JMA with the international designation of "1806" by the RSMC in Tokyo as it intensified to tropical storm. On June 16, Gaemi transitioned into an extratropical cyclone. The storm sustained the strong southwest monsoon that was previously enhanced by Tropical Storm Maliksi days prior.

On June 19, the NDRRMC reported that 3 people had died from monsoonal rains enhanced by Gaemi. Agricultural damage in Okinawa Prefecture were estimated at ¥84.58 million (US$764,000).

=== Typhoon Prapiroon (Florita) ===
- Typhoon (JMA)
- Category 1 typhoon (SSHWS)
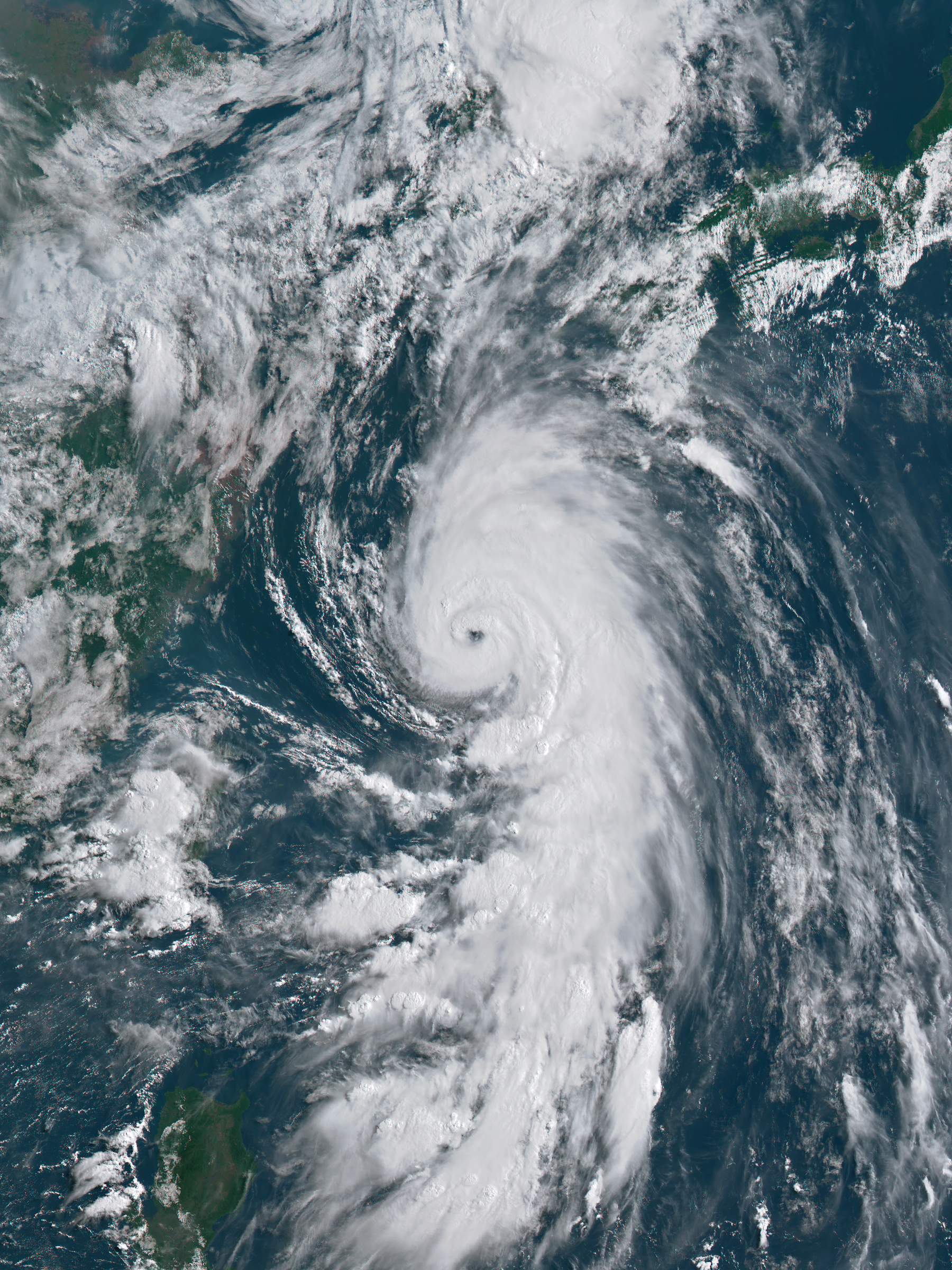
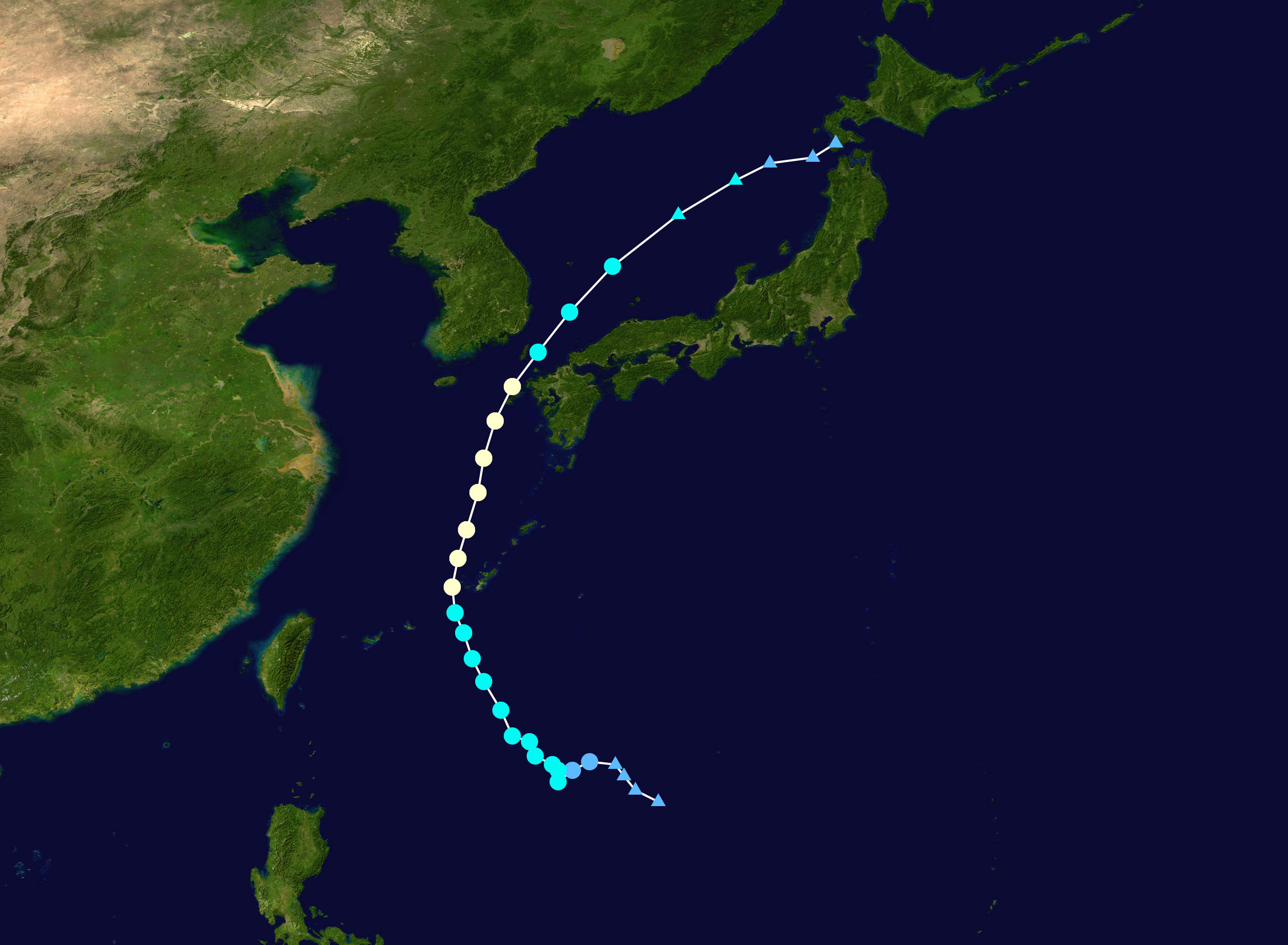
- Duration: June 28 – July 4
- Peak intensity: 120 km/h (75 mph) (10-min); 960 hPa (mbar)

A low-pressure area west of Okinotorishima developed into Tropical Depression 09W on June 28. On the next day, the PAGASA began issuing advisories, assigning it the local name Florita. 6 hours later, Florita became a tropical storm, with the JMA assigning it the name Prapiroon (1807). By July 2, Prapiroon intensified into a Category 1 typhoon as it neared Japan and Korea. By July 3, Prapiroon had attained peak intensity. On the same day, Prapiroon made landfall on Japan. After making landfall, Prapiroon briefly weakened to a tropical storm. Prapiroon became a low-pressure area on the next day, though the JMA still tracked its remnants until July 10, when it finally dissipated.

Five people were injured by the winds from the typhoon. A woman was blown away by the strong winds of the typhoon and died at a hospital she was sent to later. The typhoon also caused damages on Old Gorin Church, which as designated as heritage site four days prior, and caused damages to the stained glass in Kuroshima Catholic Church. One person from South Korea was killed by the storm. Agricultural damage in Okinawa Prefecture were about ¥49.39 million (US$446,000).

=== Typhoon Maria (Gardo) ===
- Violent typhoon (JMA)
- Category 5 super typhoon (SSHWS)
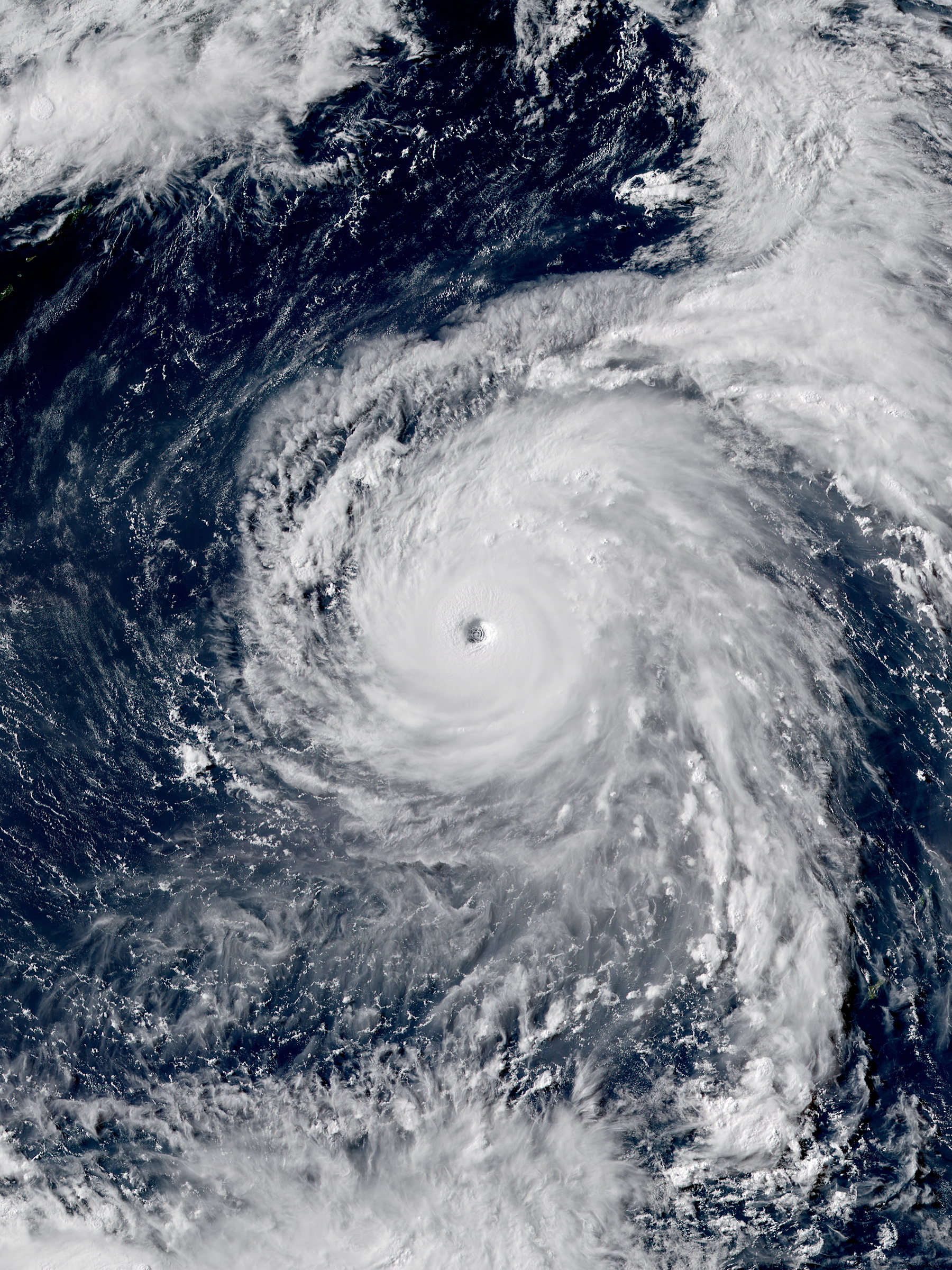
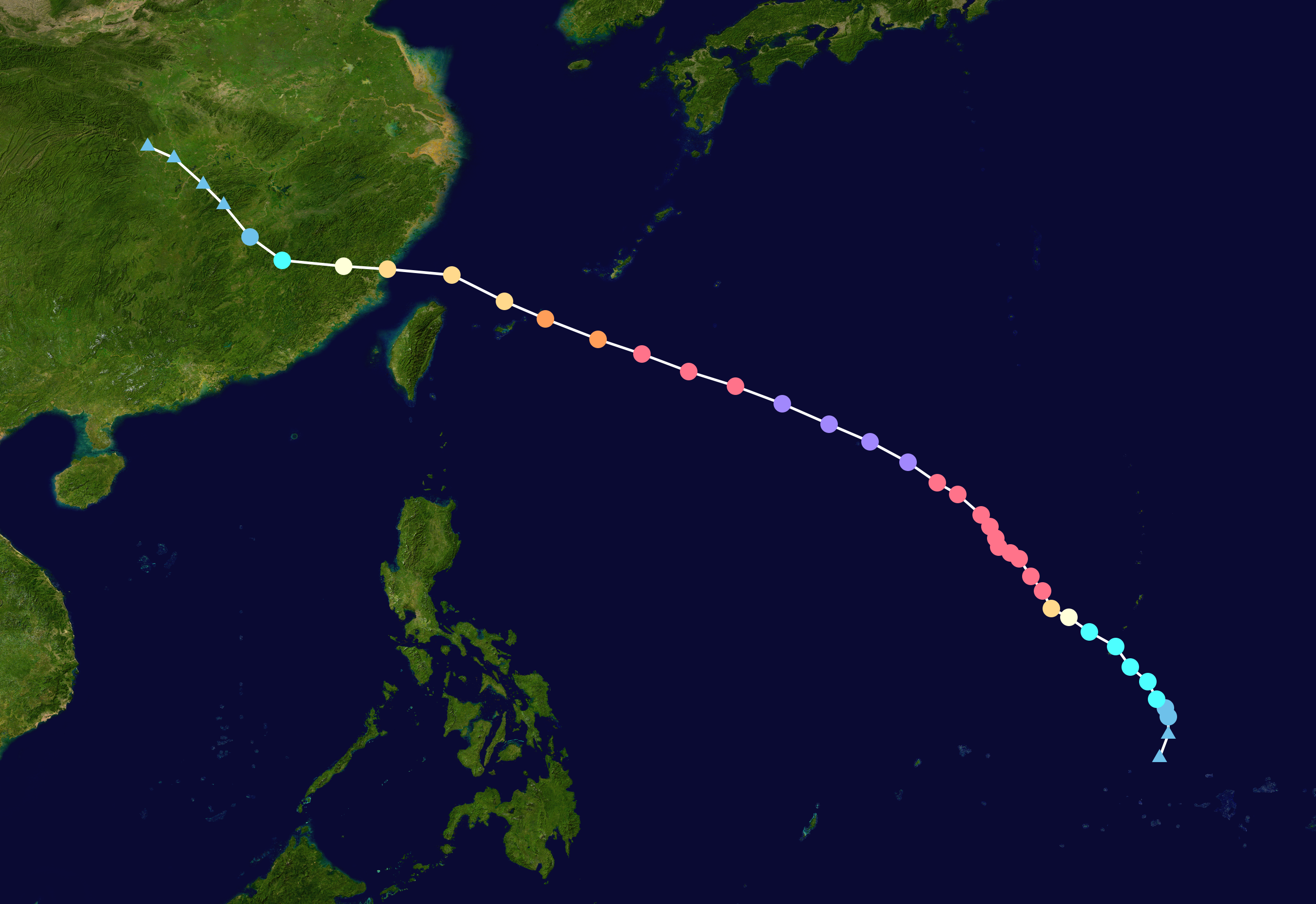
- Duration: July 3 – July 12
- Peak intensity: 195 km/h (120 mph) (10-min); 915 hPa (mbar)

A tropical disturbance formed over the Marshall Islands late on June 26. After slow development and as it drifted westward for five days, the Joint Typhoon Warning Center (JTWC) issued a Tropical Cyclone Formation Alert early on July 2 and upgraded the system to a tropical depression, designating it 10W late on the same day. Early on July 3, the Japan Meteorological Agency upgraded the low-pressure area into a tropical depression southeast of Guam and subsequently started to issue tropical cyclone warnings. Favorable environmental conditions, including moderate vertical wind shear, poleward outflow enhanced by tropical upper tropospheric trough (TUTT) cells located to the northeast and to the northwest, sea surface temperatures between 30 and 31 °C, were contributing to the development of the system on July 4. As a result, the system continued to organize and the JMA upgraded it to a tropical storm and assigned it the international name Maria at around 12:00 UTC, with the JTWC also upgrading it to a tropical storm. Six hours later, when the storm struck Guam directly, surface observations at Andersen Air Force Base recorded one-minute maximum sustained winds of 50 knots (93 km/h; 58 mph) and a minimum pressure of 984 hPa (29.06 inHg), indicating a rapidly consolidating system.

On July 5, Maria drifted northwestward slowly under the influences of a weak north–south oriented steering ridge and a strong east–west oriented subtropical ridge entrenched to the north. After being upgraded to a severe tropical storm by JMA and a typhoon by JTWC early on the same day, Maria began undergoing extremely rapid intensification due to highly favorable conditions, intensifying from a tropical storm to a Category 5 on the Saffir–Simpson scale in under 24 hours. Microwave imagery revealed an eye and the JMA upgraded Maria to a typhoon in the afternoon. The JTWC upgraded Maria to a super typhoon and reported that it reached its initial peak intensity with one-minute maximum sustained winds of 260 km/h (160 mph) at around 00:00 UTC on July 6, making it the first Category 5-equivalent tropical cyclone in the northern hemisphere since Hurricane Maria in September 2017, and the first in the western Pacific since Typhoon Nock-ten. At around 01:10 UTC on July 11, Maria made landfall over the Huangqi Peninsula of Lianjiang County, Fuzhou in Fujian, China with ten-minute maximum sustained winds of 155 km/h (96 mph) and a central pressure of 955 hPa (28.20 inHg).

When it made landfall in East China on July 10, it soaked Southern Japan and killed 1 person. Total damages in mainland China were estimated to be CN¥4.16 billion (US$623 million).

=== Tropical Storm Son-Tinh (Henry) ===
- Tropical storm (JMA)
- Tropical storm (SSHWS)
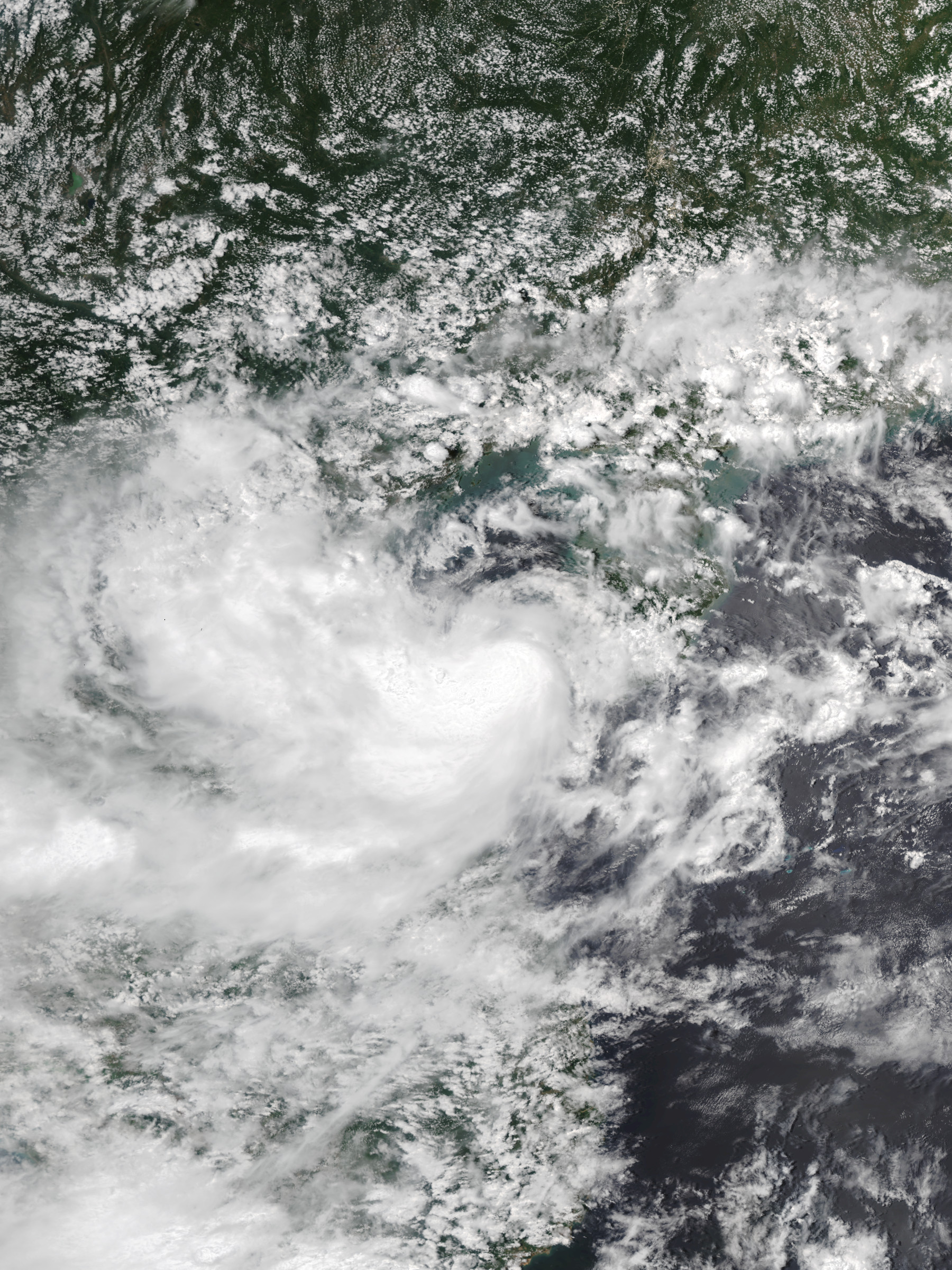
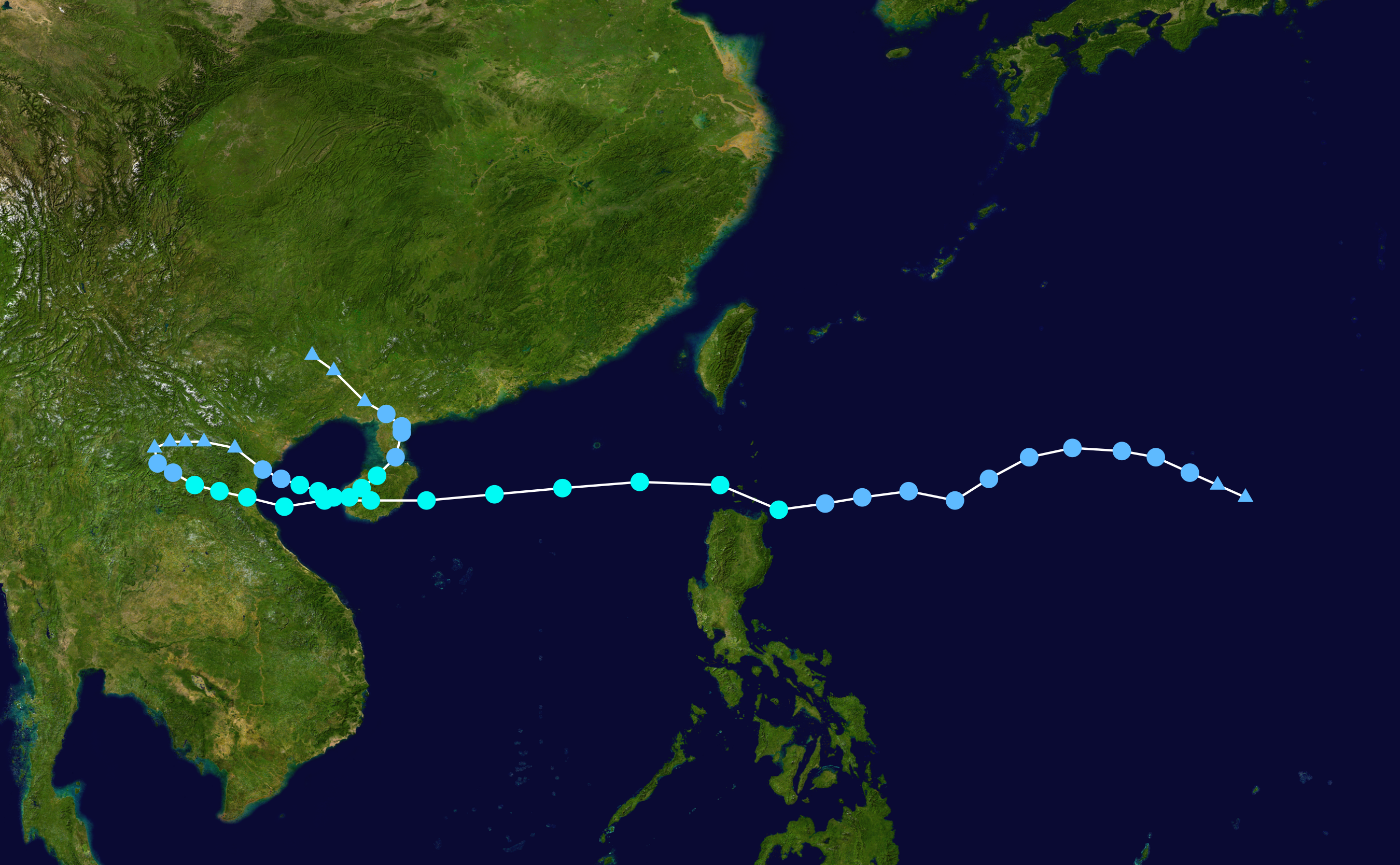
- Duration: July 16 – July 24
- Peak intensity: 75 km/h (45 mph) (10-min); 994 hPa (mbar)

An area of low-pressure strengthened into a tropical depression on July 15 to the northwest of Manila, Philippines. The JTWC designated it as 11W while the PAGASA gave it the local name Henry. As the system moved fast in a westward direction towards the Babuyan Islands, the system gradually intensified and was declared a tropical storm on July 17, with the JMA naming it as Son-Tinh as its convective structure improved. Thereafter, Son-Tinh slightly weakened as it neared Hainan Island while experiencing moderate shear. During the next day, however, Son-Tinh slightly intensified over the Gulf of Tonkin due to warm sea-surface temperatures before it made landfall on northern Vietnam. Both agencies issued their final warnings on Son-Tinh on July 19 as the system had weakened back into an area of low-pressure embedded into the monsoon. However, the JTWC continued to track the system's remnants for another two days before it dissipated.

In Vietnam, the Thanh Hóa and Nghệ An provinces suffered the most damage, especially with the wake of the storm continuing to generate significant rainfall. It caused major flooding in Northern Vietnam and the capital city of Hanoi. 35 people were killed, more than 5,000 houses, 82,000 hectares (200,000 acres) of crops, and 17,000 farm animals were either swept away, submerged, or otherwise destroyed. The storm has cut off access to several areas in the country and flood water covers several streets in the capital city. Economic losses were estimated to be ₫6.615 trillion (US$287 million).

=== Severe Tropical Storm Ampil (Inday) ===
- Severe tropical storm (JMA)
- Tropical storm (SSHWS)
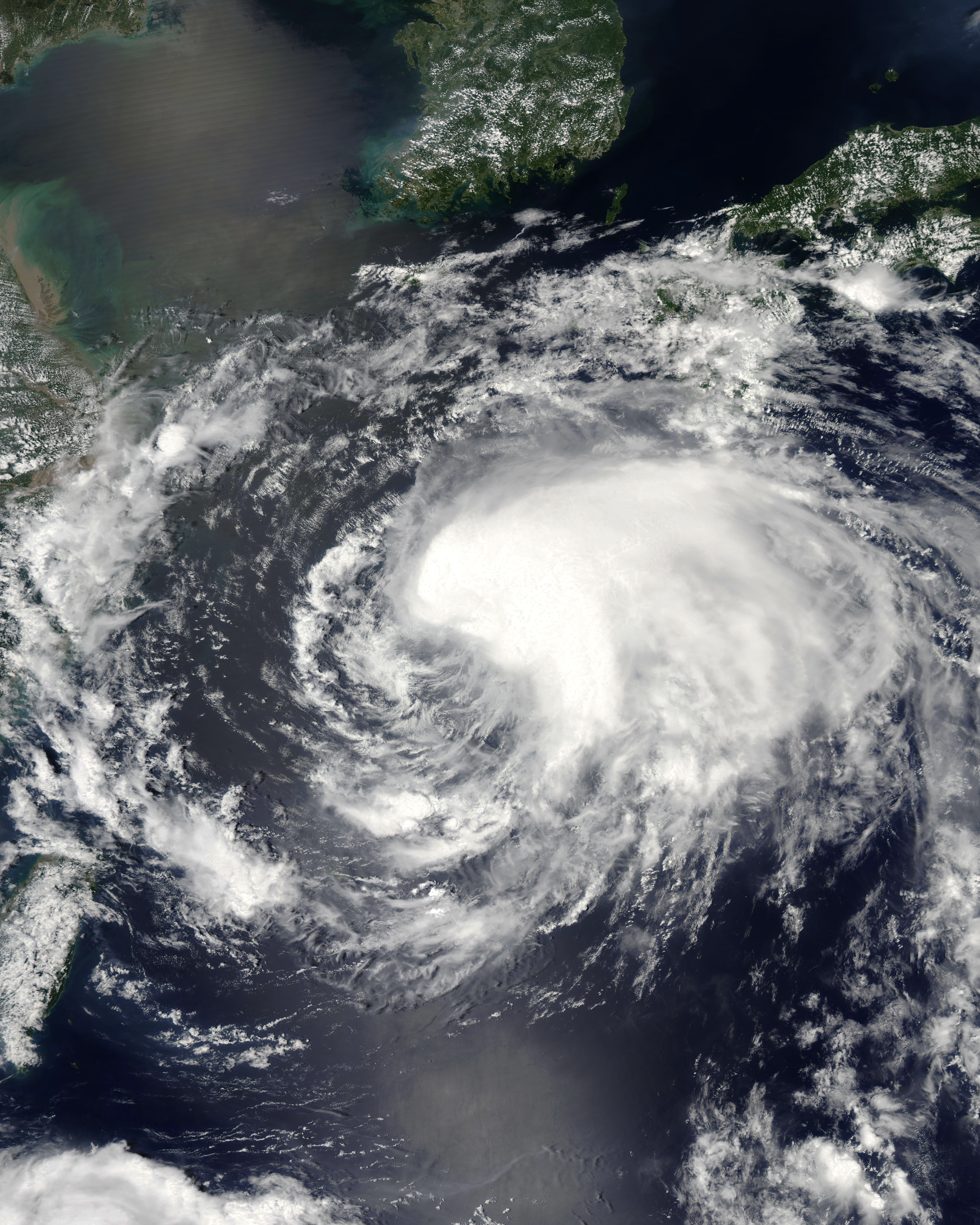
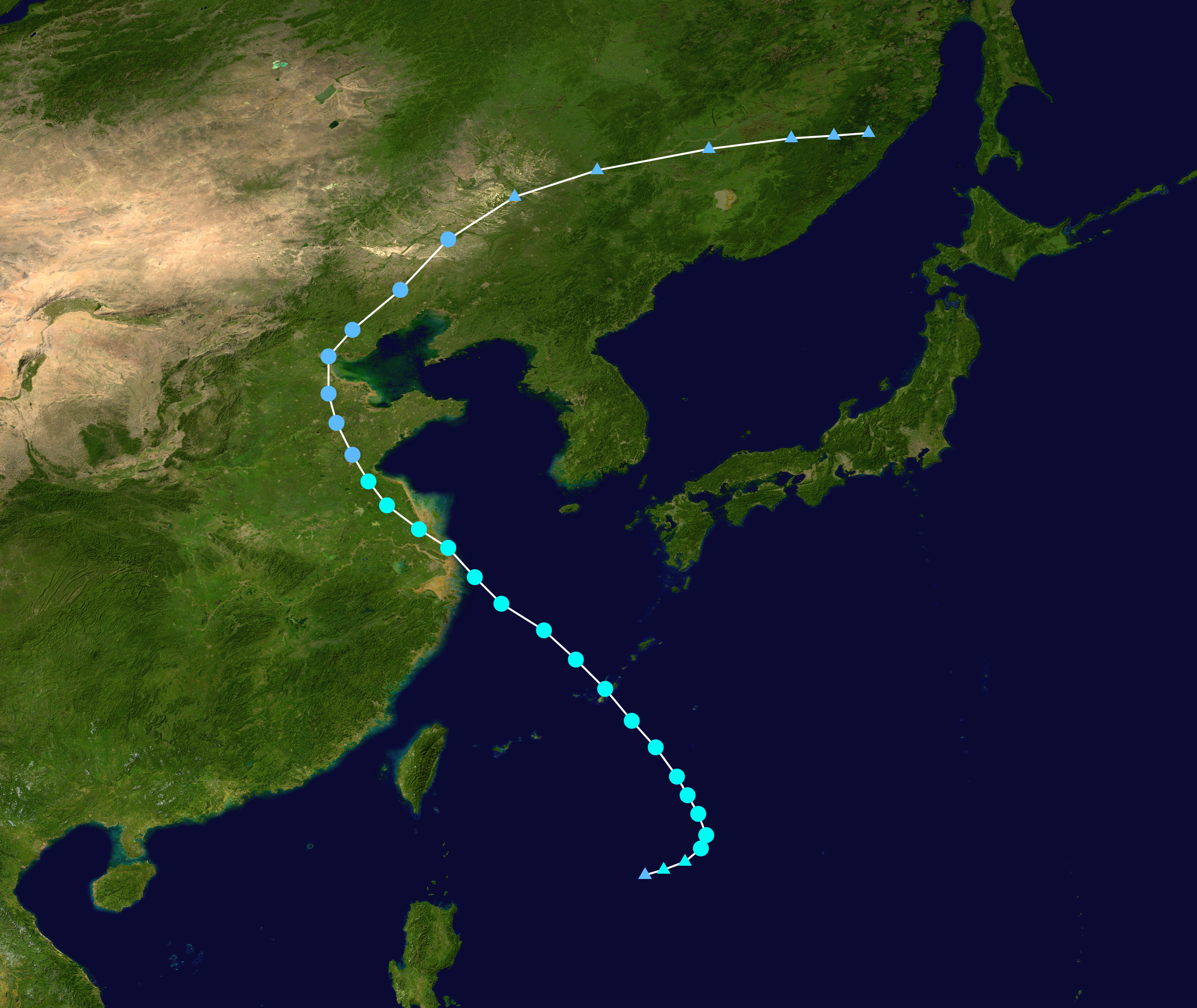
- Duration: July 17 – July 24
- Peak intensity: 95 km/h (60 mph) (10-min); 985 hPa (mbar)

On July 17, a weak tropical depression developed over the Philippine Sea. The JTWC upgraded the system to a tropical depression on the same day, designating it as 12W as it was located over a favorable environment. On the next day, the PAGASA followed suit and it was given the local name Inday. By 12:00 UTC on July 18, the JMA upgraded the system to a tropical storm, assigning it the name Ampil. As Ampil moved in a northward direction, the system's structure had broadened, being accompanied by sustained deep convection. Despite unfavorable ocean heat content, Ampil still remained over relatively warm sea surface temperatures with the inclusion of extensive deep convection, therefore Ampil was classified as a severe tropical storm. With an improved convective system, the JTWC assessed that Ampil had reached maximum 1-minute sustained winds of 95 km/h (59 mph). Ampil reached its peak intensity with a minimum pressure of 985 hPa and maintained that intensity for the next few days as the track of Ampil changed direction. On July 21, the system's center became exposed as the system slightly weakened. On the next day, the JMA downgraded Ampil back to a tropical storm as it made landfall on China with a lack of convection. Ampil weakened further to a tropical depression on July 23, and both agencies issued their final advisories on the system. The JMA continued tracking the system until it weakened into an area of low pressure at 18:00 UTC on July 24.

Heavy rain in Shandong Province—accumulating to 237 mm (9.3 in) in Tianjin—caused significant flooding, inundating 31,600 hectares of crops and affecting 260,000 people. One person was killed in China and total economic losses reached CN¥1.63 billion (US$241 million).

=== Tropical Depression 13W (Josie) ===
- Tropical depression (JMA)
- Tropical storm (SSHWS)
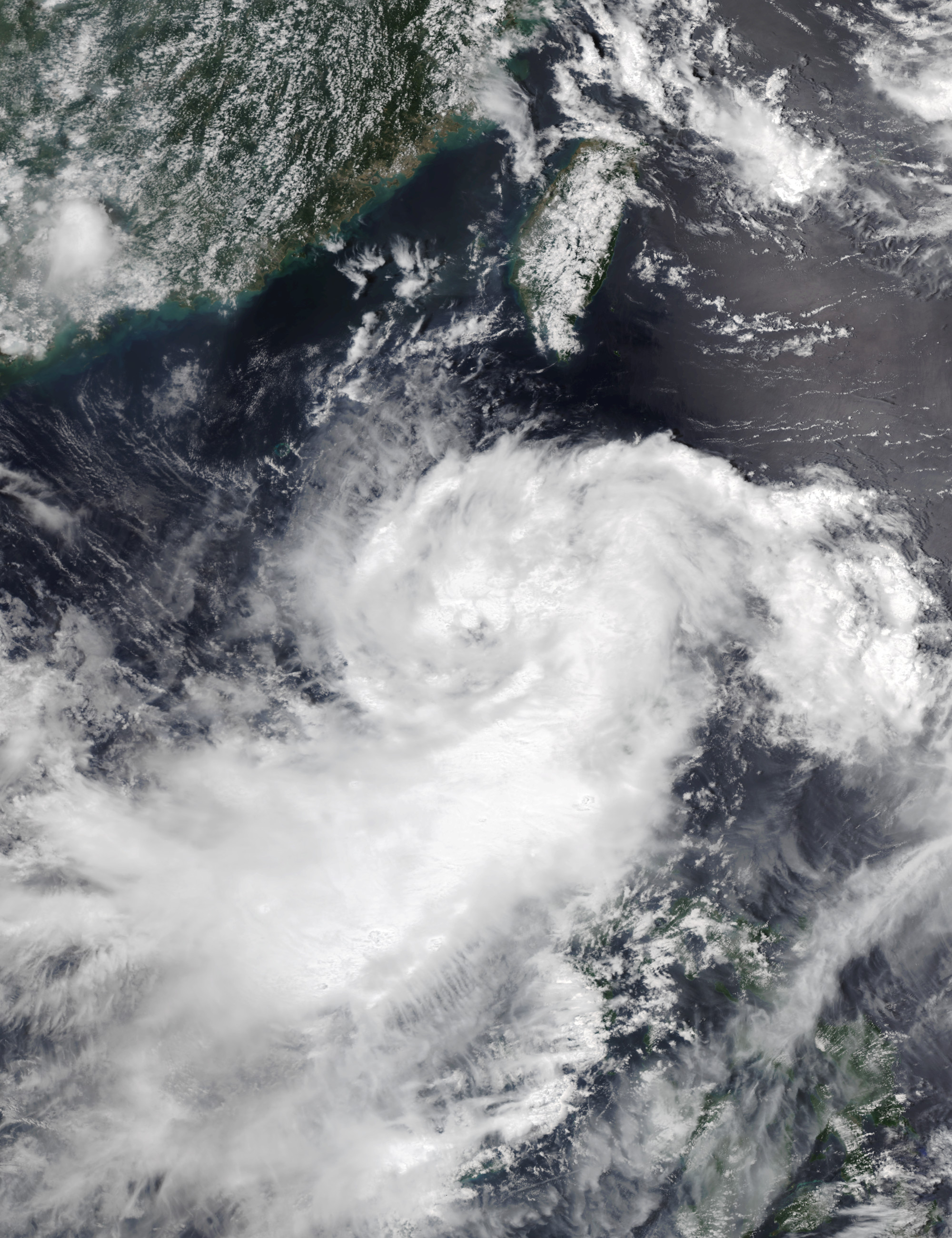
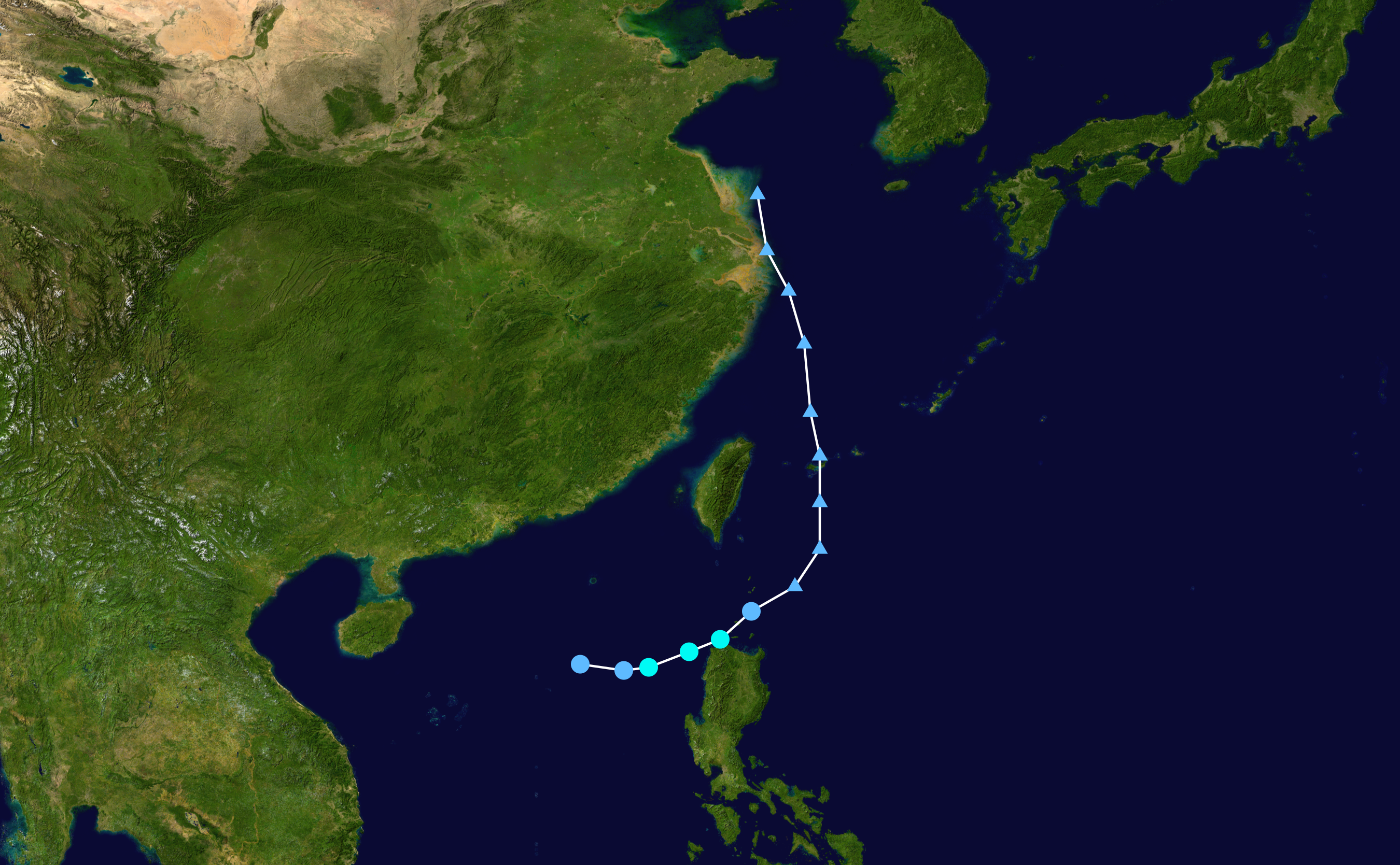
- Duration: July 20 – July 23
- Peak intensity: 55 km/h (35 mph) (10-min); 996 hPa (mbar)

A tropical depression formed in the South China Sea on July 20 according to the JMA. On July 21, the system entered the Philippine Area of Responsibility and was assigned the local name Josie, making it the 10th named storm to enter the PAR. The JTWC upgraded the system to a tropical storm on the same day. The system missed landfall within kilometers on Saud, Ilocos Norte. It moved north and exited the PAR on the next day. The remnants of 13W dissipated off the coast of China.

After the formation of the previous two systems, the southwest monsoon had been extremely active in the Philippines. By August 1, a total of 16 people had been killed due to extreme flooding, while damages have been recorded at ₱4.66 billion (US$87.4 million). The southwest monsoon had been active since Typhoon Maria. July had 5 days of class suspensions in Metro Manila, making it the second in history since Typhoon Ketsana struck Metro Manila and caused ocean-high flooding since 2009.

=== Severe Tropical Storm Wukong ===
- Severe tropical storm (JMA)
- Category 1 typhoon (SSHWS)
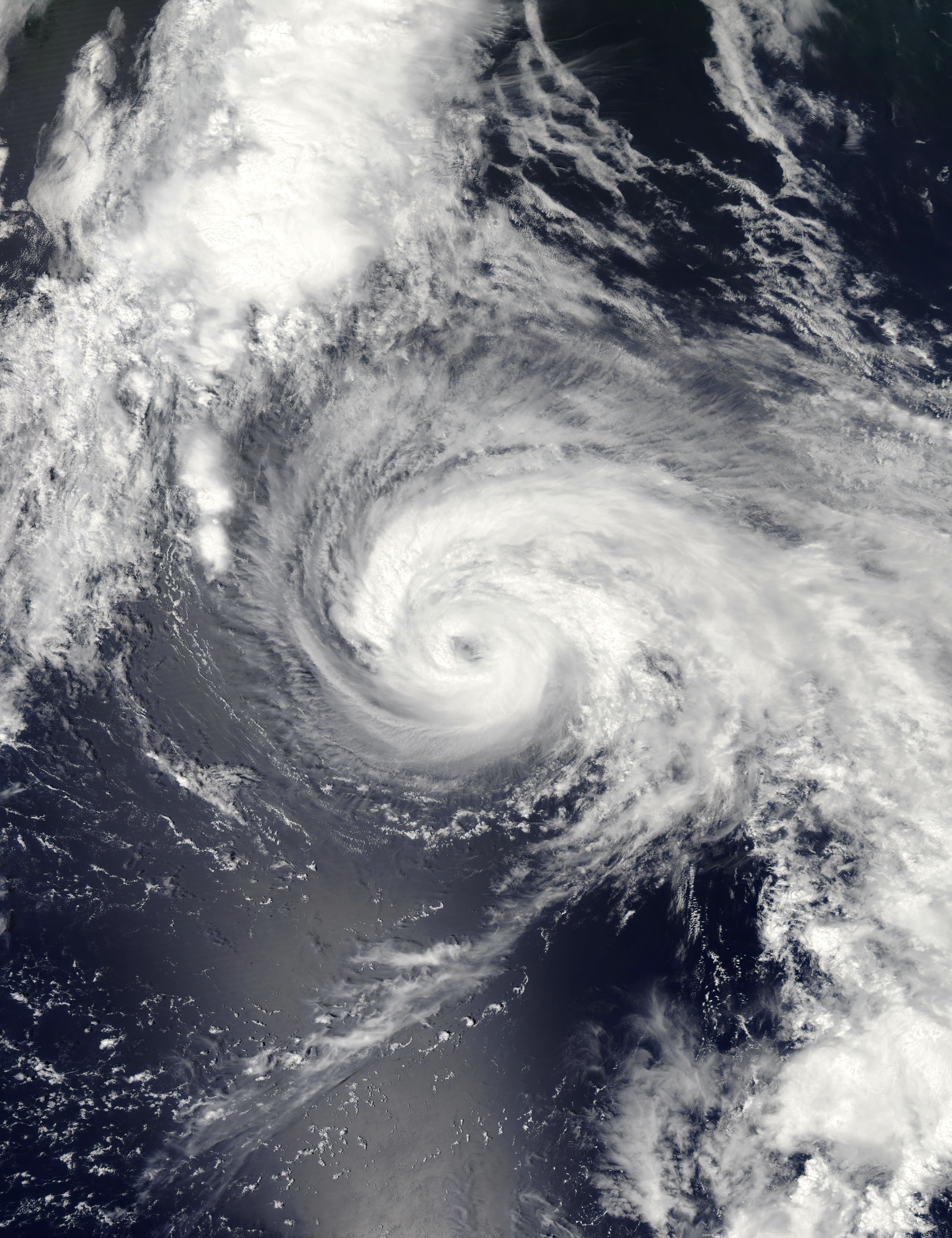
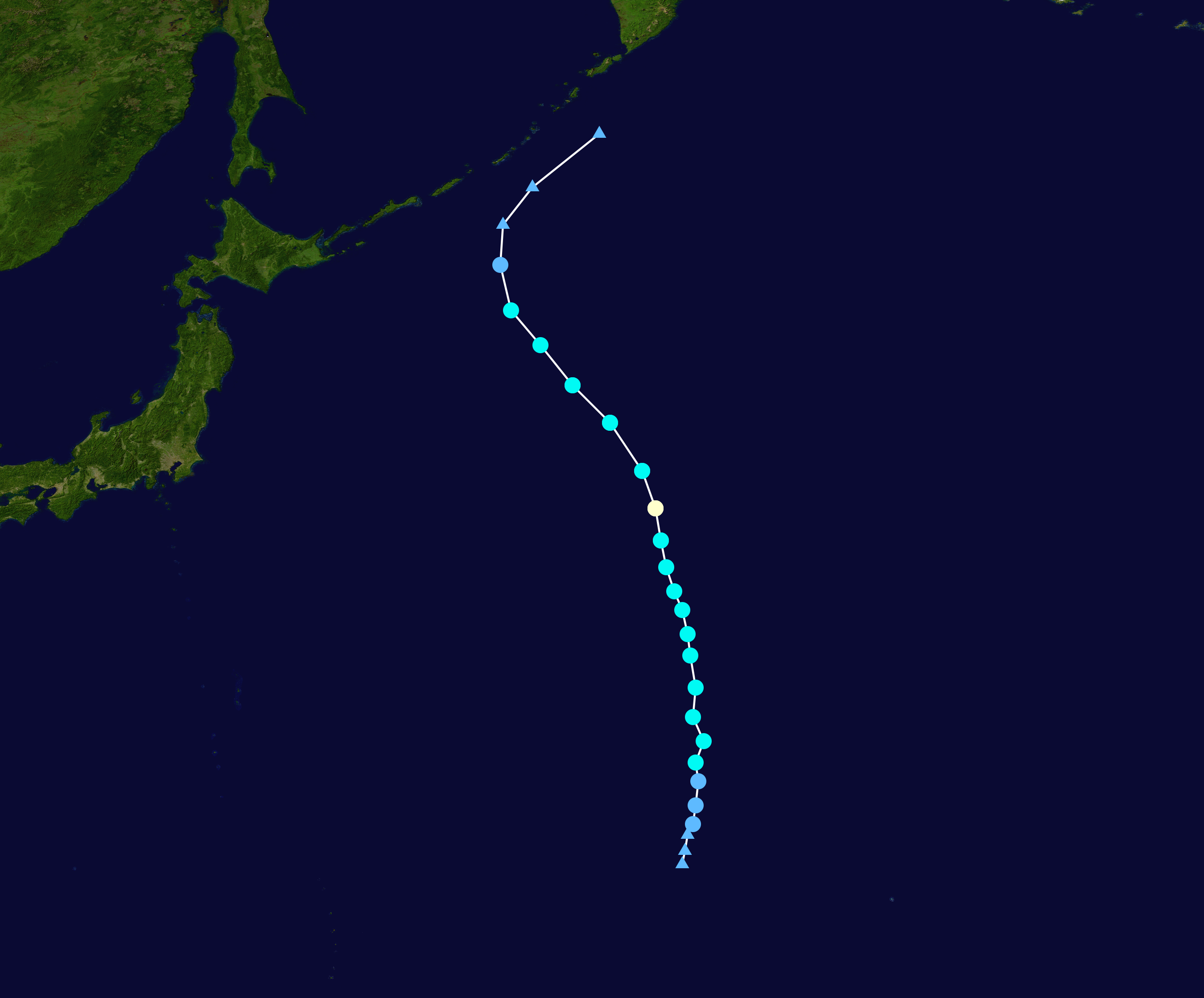
- Duration: July 22 – July 26
- Peak intensity: 95 km/h (60 mph) (10-min); 990 hPa (mbar)

Late on July 21, the JTWC began to issue advisories on Tropical Depression 14W as it developed about 603 km (375 mi) east-southeast of the Japanese island of Minami-Tori-shima. The JMA began tracking the system on the early hours of July 22. Later that day, the JTWC upgraded 14W to a tropical storm, though convection was sheared and the system was located in unfavorable southwesterly shear. Within the next 24 hours, 14W began to organize with deep convection obscuring its LLCC, and at 12:00 UTC on July 23, the JMA upgraded the system to a tropical storm, naming it Wukong. Moving poleward, Wukong gradually intensified while entering an area of favorable environment with lesser shear, and at 00:00 UTC on July 25, the JMA upgraded Wukong to a severe tropical storm. Nine hours later, the JTWC upgraded Wukong to a Category 1 typhoon after satellite images depicted a 30-nmi ragged eye. By July 26, both the JMA and the JTWC issued their final advisories on Wukong as the system rapidly transitioned into an extratropical cyclone. Wukong's extratropical remnants were tracked until late on July 27 when it was last noticed off the eastern coast of Russia Far East.

=== Typhoon Jongdari ===
- Typhoon (JMA)
- Category 2 typhoon (SSHWS)
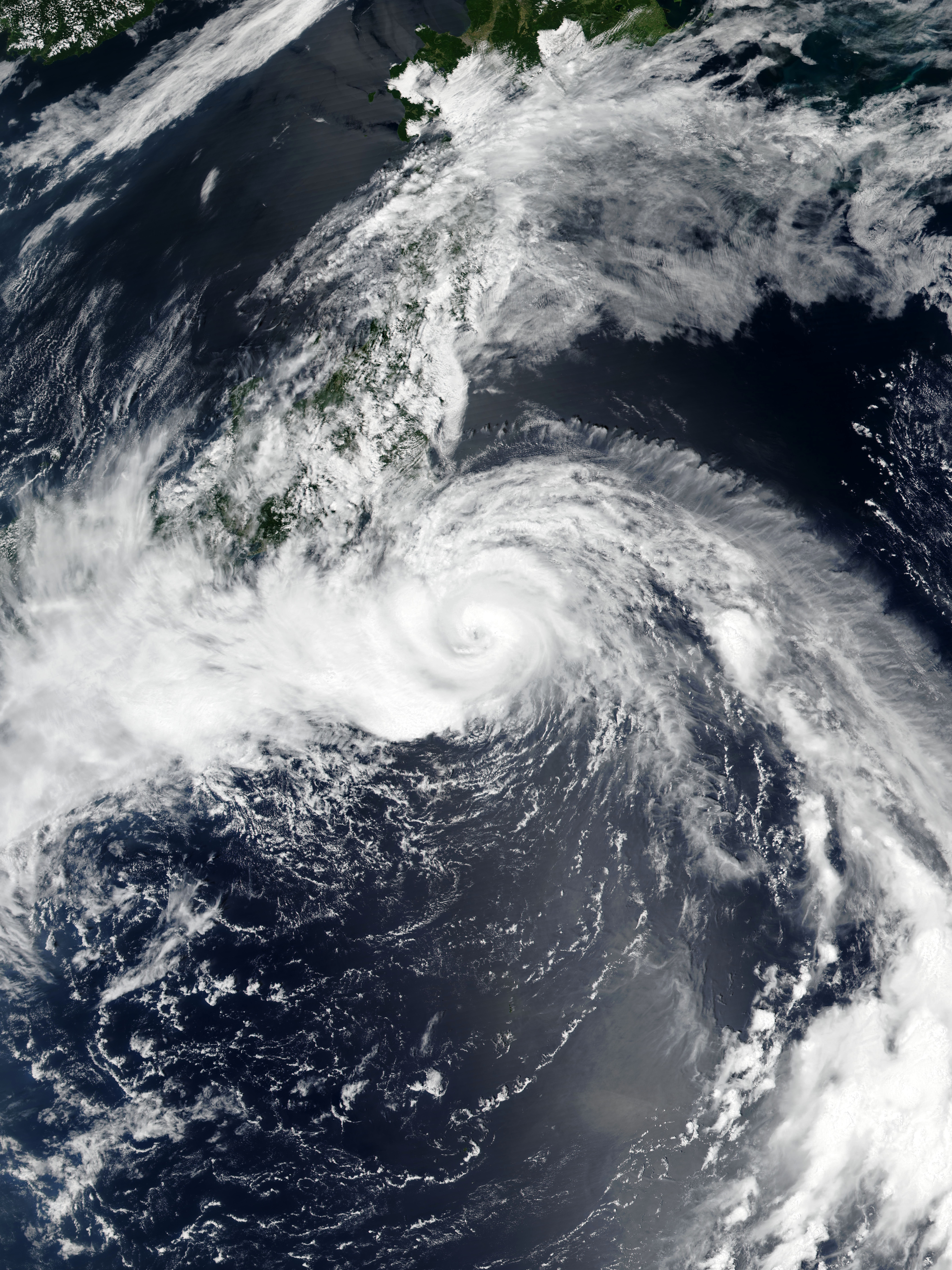
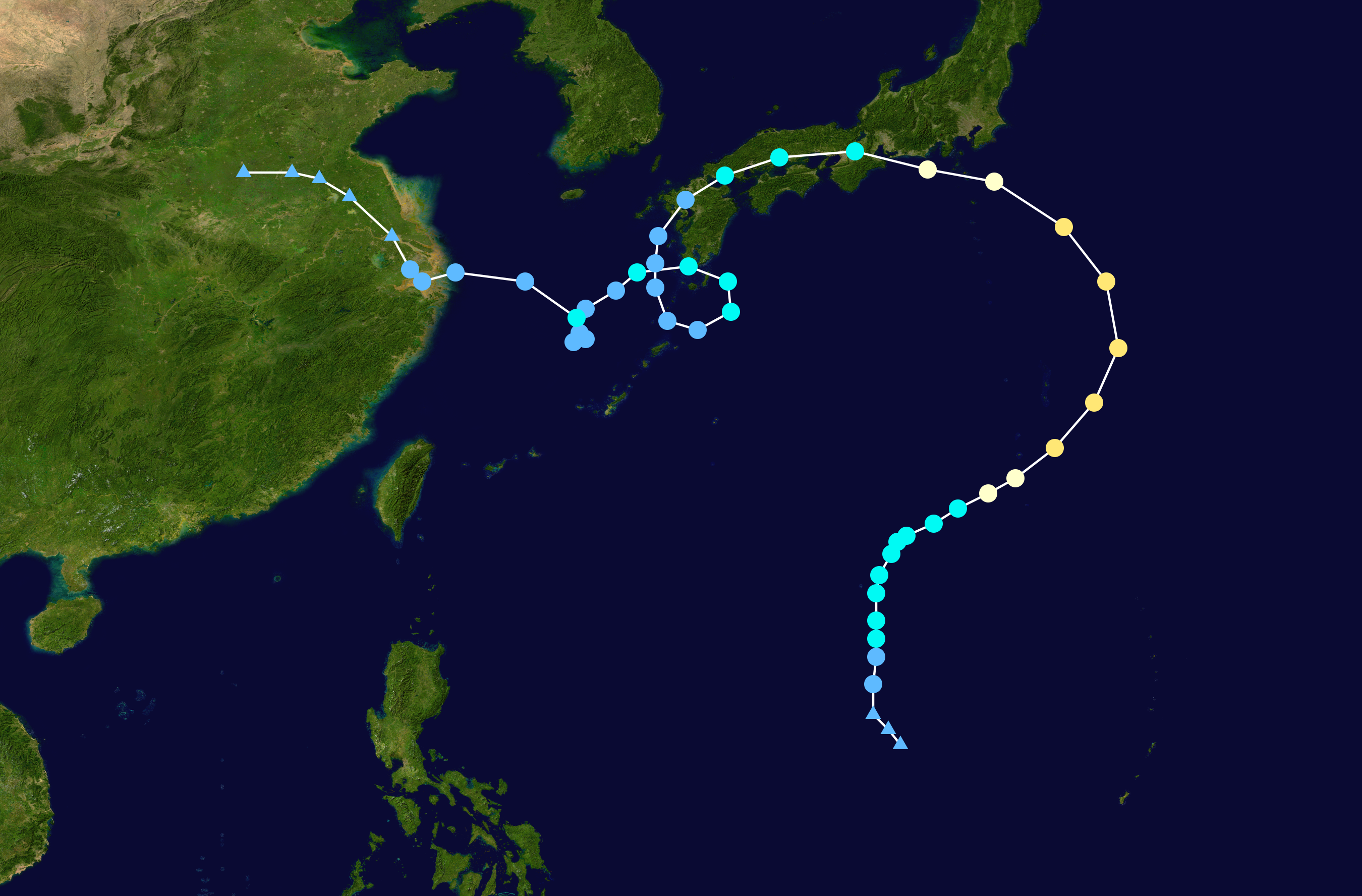
- Duration: July 23 – August 4
- Peak intensity: 140 km/h (85 mph) (10-min); 960 hPa (mbar)

A tropical disturbance formed southeast of Guam on July 19 and tracked westward steadily. After issuing a Tropical Cyclone Formation Alert on July 21, the Joint Typhoon Warning Center (JTWC) upgraded the system to a tropical depression early on July 22, although the location of its low-level circulation center was not clear. The Japan Meteorological Agency (JMA), however, kept reporting it as a low-pressure area until it was upgraded to a tropical depression late on July 23. After slow consolidation for several days, the system was upgraded to a tropical storm near Okinotorishima at around 18:00 on July 24 by the JMA and the JTWC, being assigned the international name Jongdari. Microwave imagery revealed a low-level eyewall forming on the next day, indicating a consolidating system. After the JMA upgraded Jongdari to a severe tropical storm at noon, the system accelerated northeastward under the influence of a near-equatorial ridge to the south.

On July 26, as Jongdari started to interact with an upper-level cold-core low to the north which significantly enhanced poleward outflow, it intensified to a typhoon in the afternoon despite increasingly unfavorable vertical wind shear. Over the warm sea surface temperatures between 29 and 30 °C (84 and 86 °F) near the Ogasawara Islands, JMA reported that Jongdari had reached peak intensity at 00:00 UTC on July 27, with ten-minute maximum sustained winds of 140 km/h (87 mph) and a minimum central pressure of 965 hPa (28.5 inHg). Although the JTWC indicated Jongdari reached peak intensity at 12:00 UTC with one-minute maximum sustained winds of 175 km/h (109 mph), the rugged eye of Jongdari remained periodically visible with an elongated structure due to further interaction of the upper-level low which had moved to the northwest side of the typhoon. As the steering influence transitioned to a subtropical ridge to the northeast, Jongdari executed a counter-clockwise turn to the southeast of Japan.

Jongdari began to be inundated by subsidence on July 28 as the Fujiwhara effect had made the upper-level low move to the west of the typhoon. It also initiated a weakening trend while accelerating northwestward and then westward toward the Japanese island of Honshu. At around 01:00 JST on July 29 (16:00 UTC July 28), Jongdari made landfall over Ise, Mie Prefecture with ten-minute maximum sustained winds of 120 km/h (75 mph) and a central pressure of 975 hPa (28.8 inHg). The storm weakened rapidly inland before making its second landfall over Buzen, Fukuoka Prefecture, at around 17:30 JST (08:30 UTC), with ten-minute sustained winds of 75 km/h (47 mph) and a central pressure of 992 hPa (29.3 inHg). At around 10:30 CST (02:30 UTC) on August 3, Jongdari made landfall over Jinshan District, Shanghai as a tropical storm. Jongdari rapidly weakened after landfall, dissipating on the next day. No fatalities were recorded for this storm.

=== Tropical Depression 16W ===
- Tropical depression (JMA)
- Subtropical storm (SSHWS)
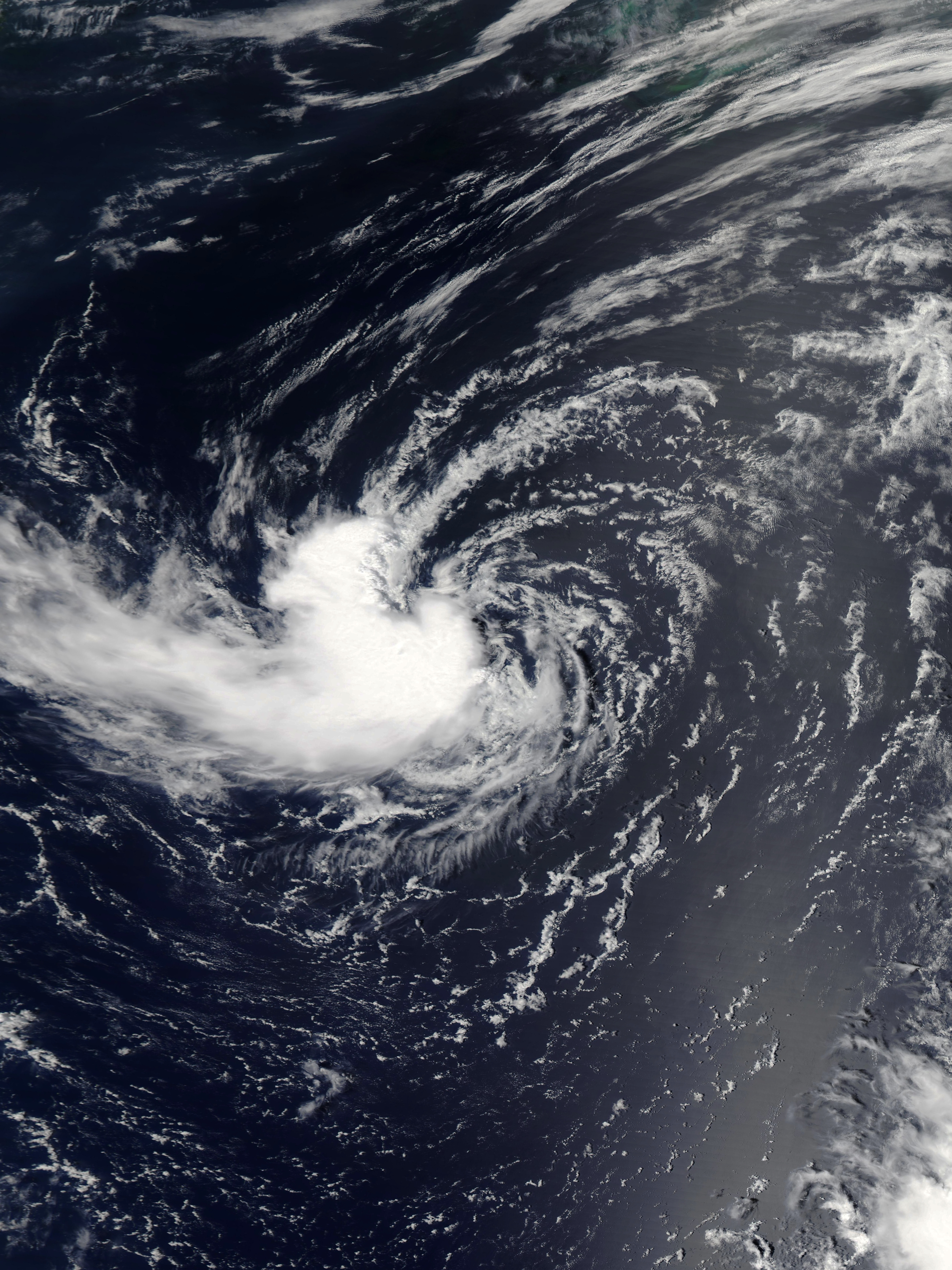
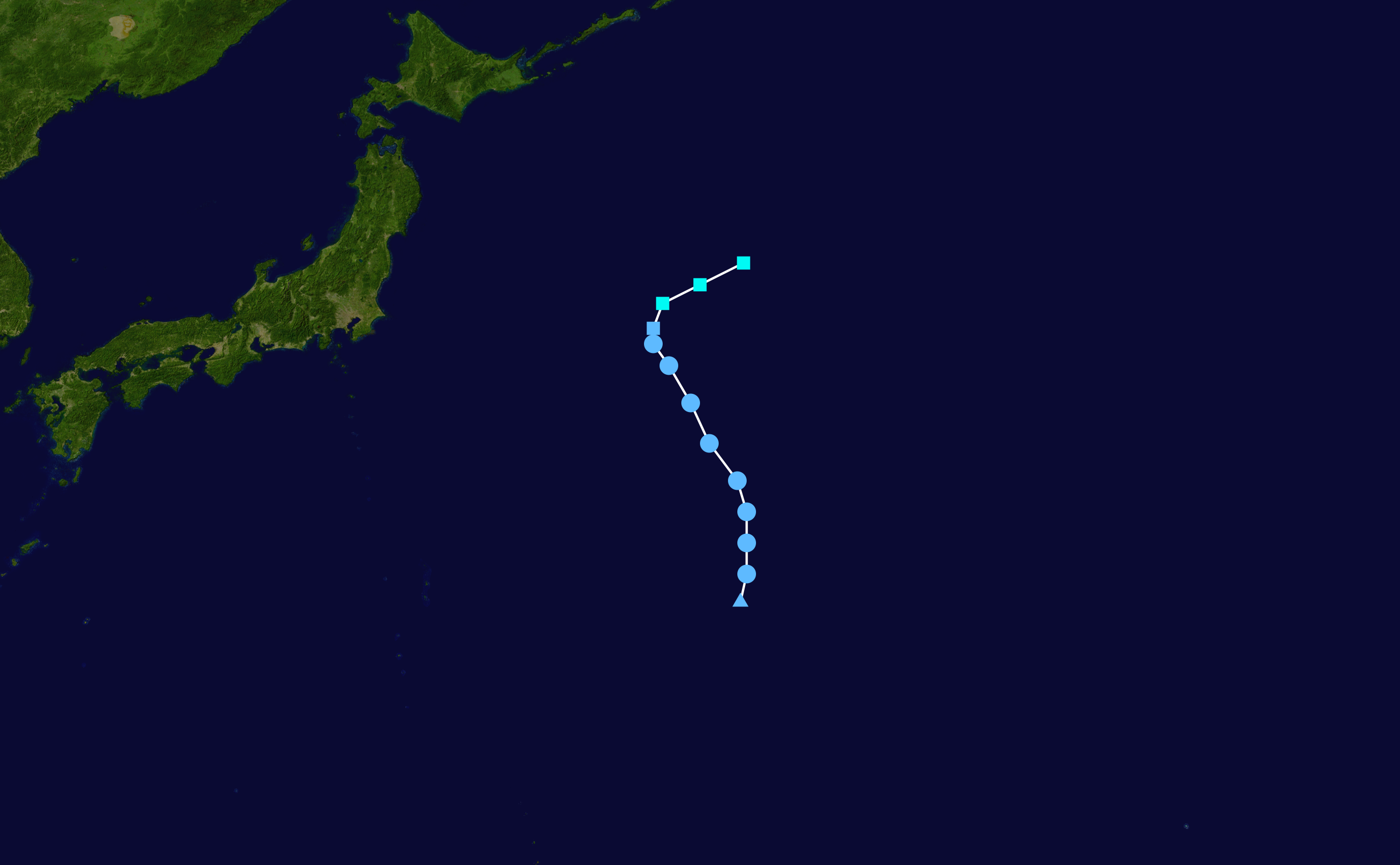
- Duration: July 31 – August 1
- Peak intensity: 55 km/h (35 mph) (10-min); 1002 hPa (mbar)

A tropical disturbance developed about 807 km (501 mi) north-northeast of Iwo To by July 29. The JTWC upgraded the system to Tropical Depression 16W during the next day after its convective structure had slightly improved despite the system located in moderate to strong wind shear. By July 31, the JMA followed suit on classifying the system as a tropical depression. 16W's center late became exposed with deep convection displaced due to continued shear. Originally, the system was forecast to reach tropical storm intensity with only 35 knot winds, but the system's center had become asymmetric with a fully sheared center. The JTWC issued their final advisory on 21:00 UTC of the same day, after 16W had fully transitioned into a subtropical cyclone, though both agencies continued to track the system until August 2.

=== Typhoon Shanshan ===
- Typhoon (JMA)
- Category 2 typhoon (SSHWS)
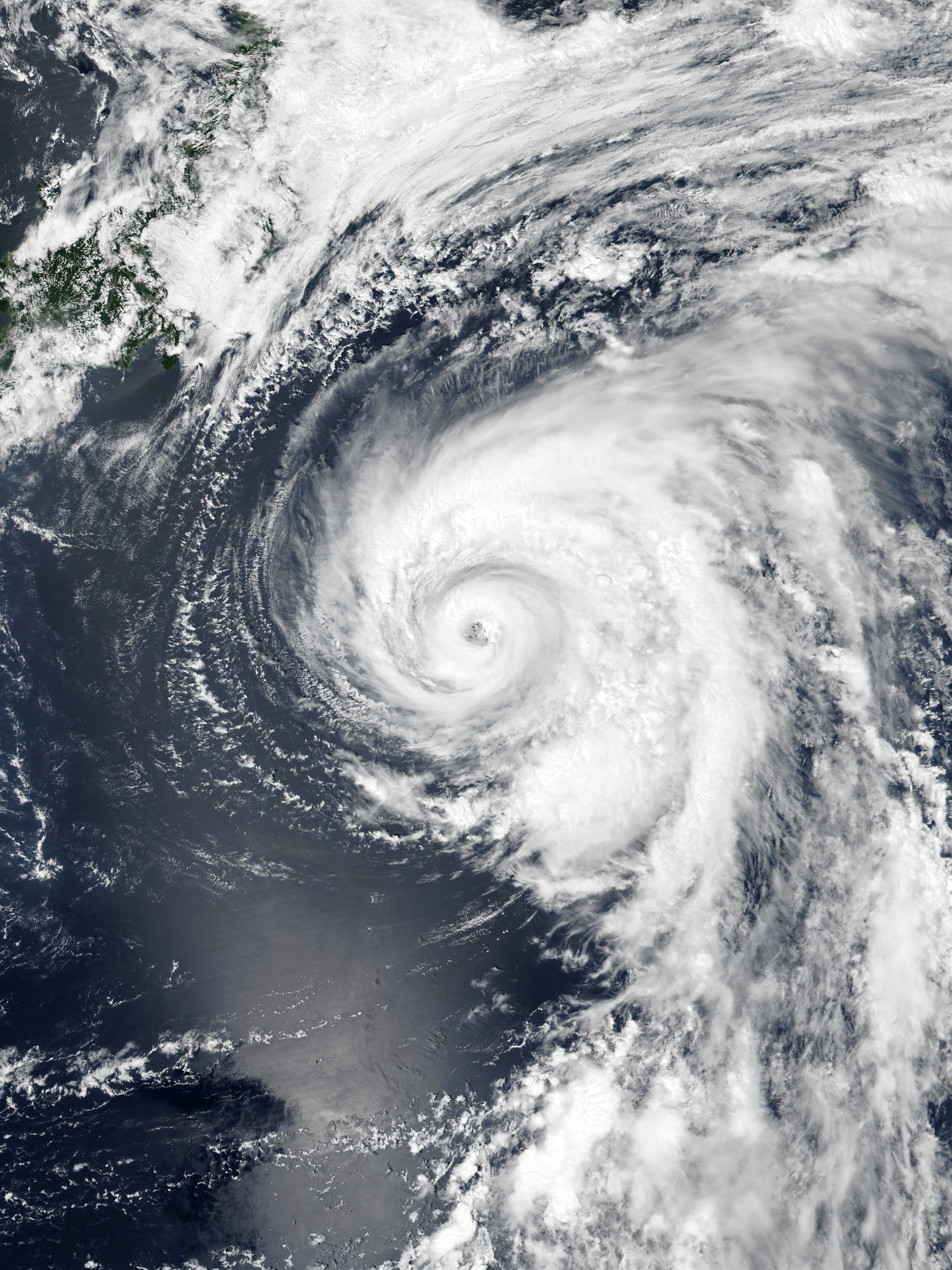
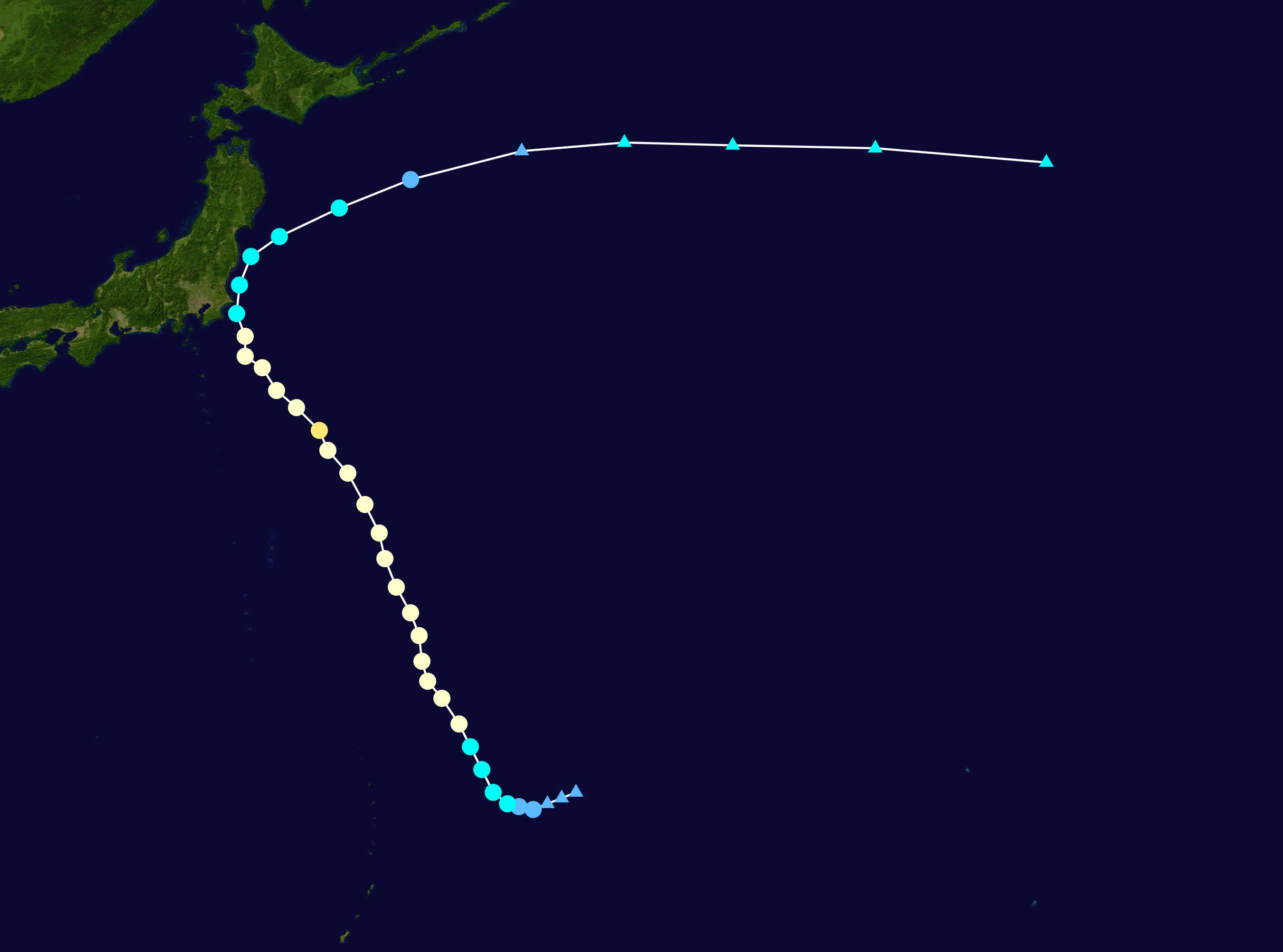
- Duration: August 2 – August 10
- Peak intensity: 130 km/h (80 mph) (10-min); 970 hPa (mbar)

A tropical depression developed east-northeast of Guam on August 2. At 21:00 UTC on the same day, the JTWC began tracking the system, giving it the identifier 17W. 17W intensified into a tropical storm on August 3, with the JMA assigning it the name Shanshan. The storm was located over a favorable environment as the system was gradually consolidating, and it intensified into a severe tropical storm on August 3. During the next day, both the JMA and JTWC upgraded Shanshan to a typhoon after deep convection was seen wrapping into its developing center. The JMA later analysed that the storm had peaked in intensity with 10-minute winds of 130 km/h (81 mph) and a minimum pressure of 970 hPa, remaining that intensity for several days. The JTWC stated that Shanshan had slightly weakened after a strengthening trend by August 6 after its eye became ragged and slightly displaced. On August 7, Shanshan began to re-intensify and reached its peak strength as a Category 2 typhoon with 1-minute winds of 165 km/h (103 mph) while nearing southeastern Japan. Thereafter, Shanshan began to change its course towards the east as it rapidly weakened. The JTWC issued their final advisory on August 9, though the JMA tracked the system until it became extratropical at 06:00 UTC on August 10.

In Okinawa, about 600 people were evacuated from their homes to shelters. About 386 flights to western Japan were canceled due to the storm. There was no major damage, but four people were injured by the storm. More than 2,000 people evacuated from their homes early on the morning hours of Thursday. Overall losses in Miyagi Prefecture were counted at ¥96.2 million (US$866,000).

=== Tropical Storm Yagi (Karding) ===
- Tropical storm (JMA)
- Tropical storm (SSHWS)
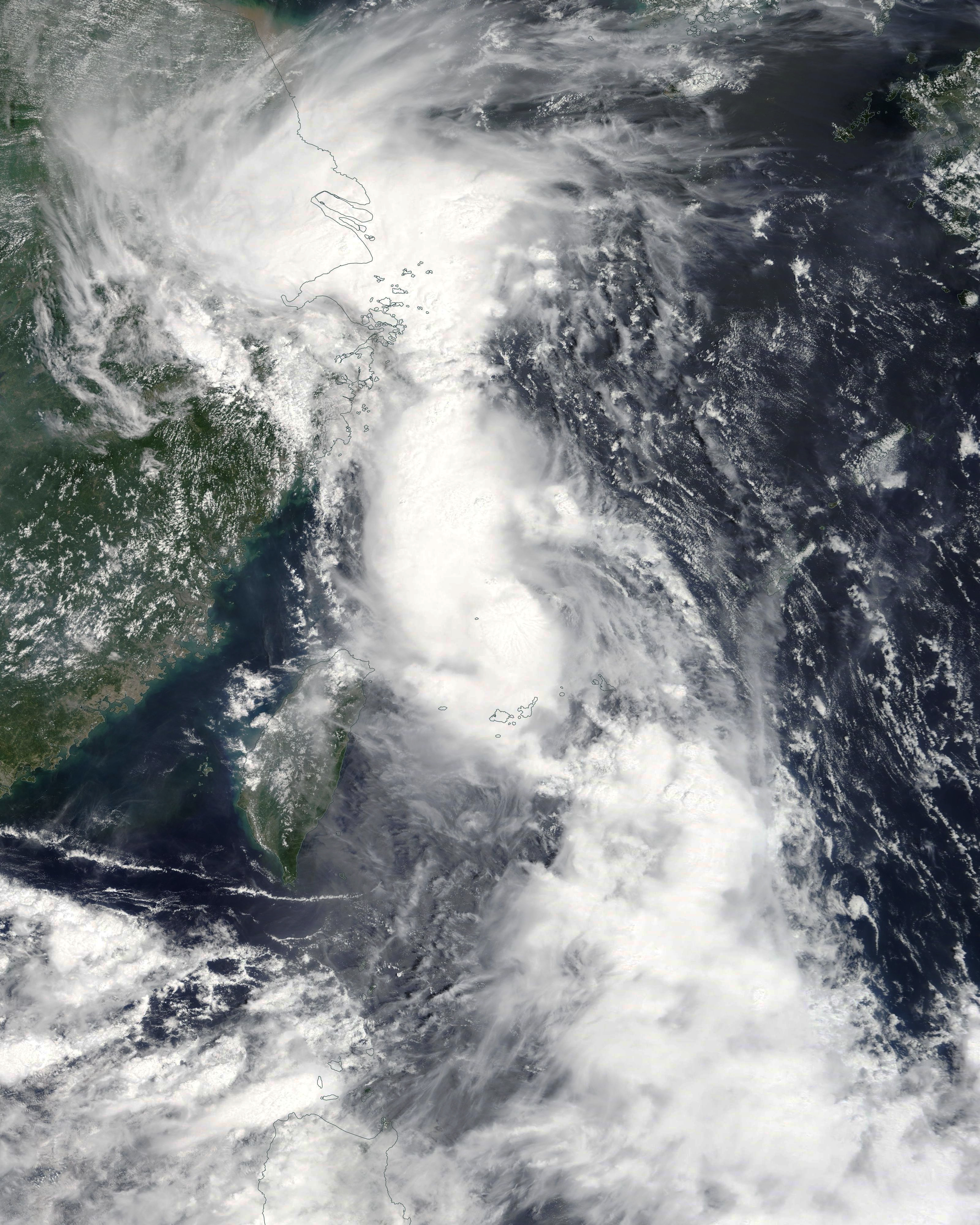
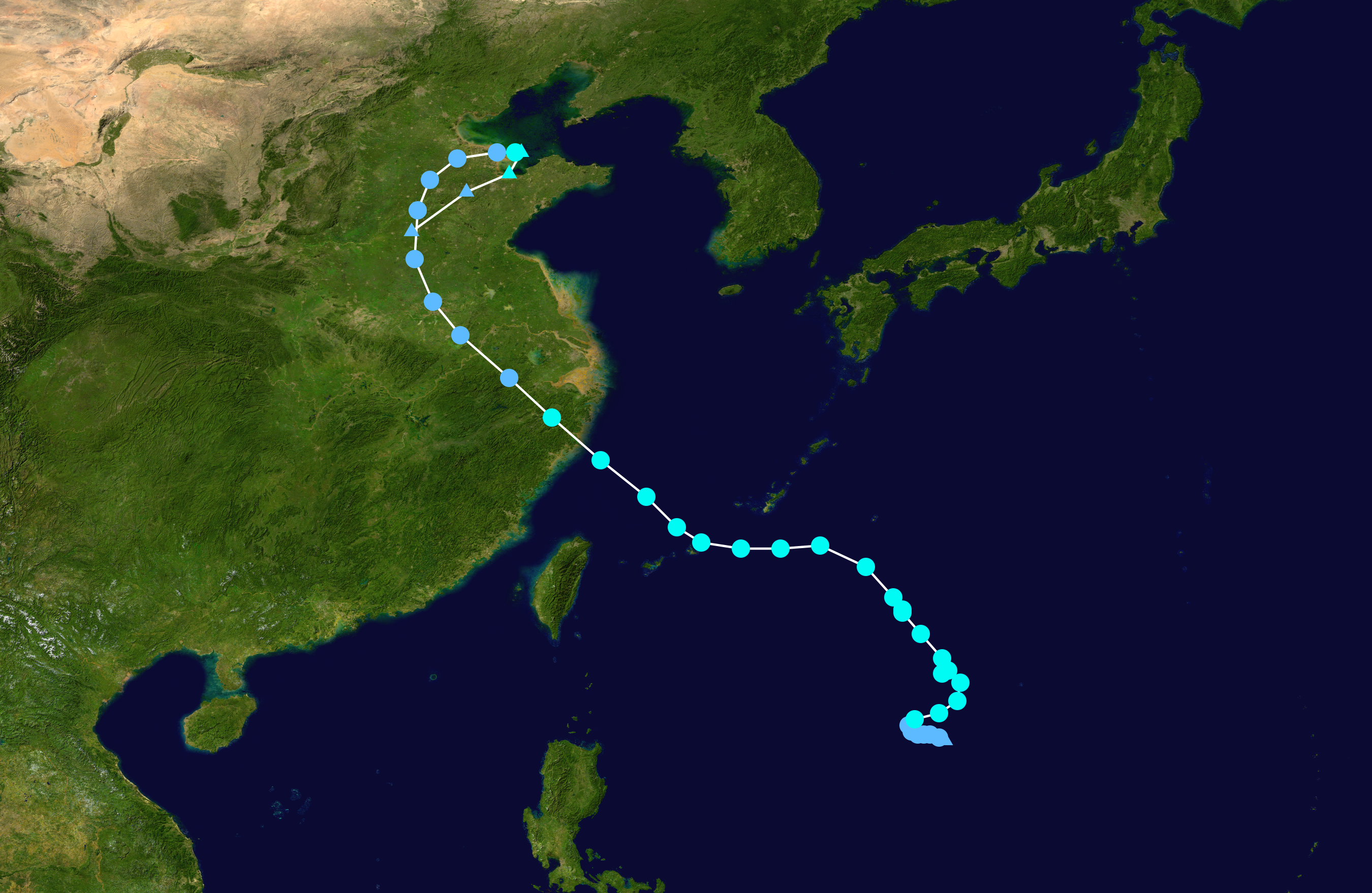
- Duration: August 6 – August 15
- Peak intensity: 75 km/h (45 mph) (10-min); 990 hPa (mbar)

A tropical disturbance had persisted towards the southwest of Iwo To on August 1. After the course of five days, the system was upgraded into a tropical depression by the JMA, with the JTWC following suit several hours later, designating it as 18W. The PAGASA also began issuing bulletins on the system, assigning it the local name Karding. Karding maintained its intensity as a tropical depression due to moderate to strong easterly shear despite persistent convection surrounding the system. By August 8, a METOP-A ASCAT image showed that the system had winds of 35 knots, which prompted the JTWC to upgrade it to a tropical storm. The JMA around the same time did the same, assigning it the name Yagi. Within the next day, Yagi curved towards the northwest, struggling to intensify due to wind shear. At 12:00 UTC on August 11, the JMA estimated that Yagi reached its peak strength with 10-minute winds of 75 km/h (47 mph) and a minimum pressure of 990 hPa.

The JTWC declared that Yagi reached winds of 85 km/h (53 mph) at 12:00 UTC on August 12 after the storm had consolidated further with an improved structure. Yagi made landfall shortly thereafter over Wenling, in Taizhou of Zhejiang, China, at around 23:35 CST (15:35 UTC) on August 12. By 21:00 UTC of that day, the JTWC issued their final advisory on Yagi, though they continued to track it until it weakened further into a tropical depression early on August 13. The JMA did the same on 06:00 UTC of August 13. The JMA tracked Yagi until it became an extratropical system on August 15.

Despite not making landfall on the Philippines, the storm enhanced the southwest monsoon which brought extreme flooding to many regions within the country. According to the NDRRMC, 5 people died along with ₱996 million (US$19 million) worth of damages. In East China, Yagi killed a total of 3 people and total damages were counted to be CN¥2.51 billion (US$367 million).

=== Tropical Storm Bebinca ===
- Tropical storm (JMA)
- Tropical storm (SSHWS)
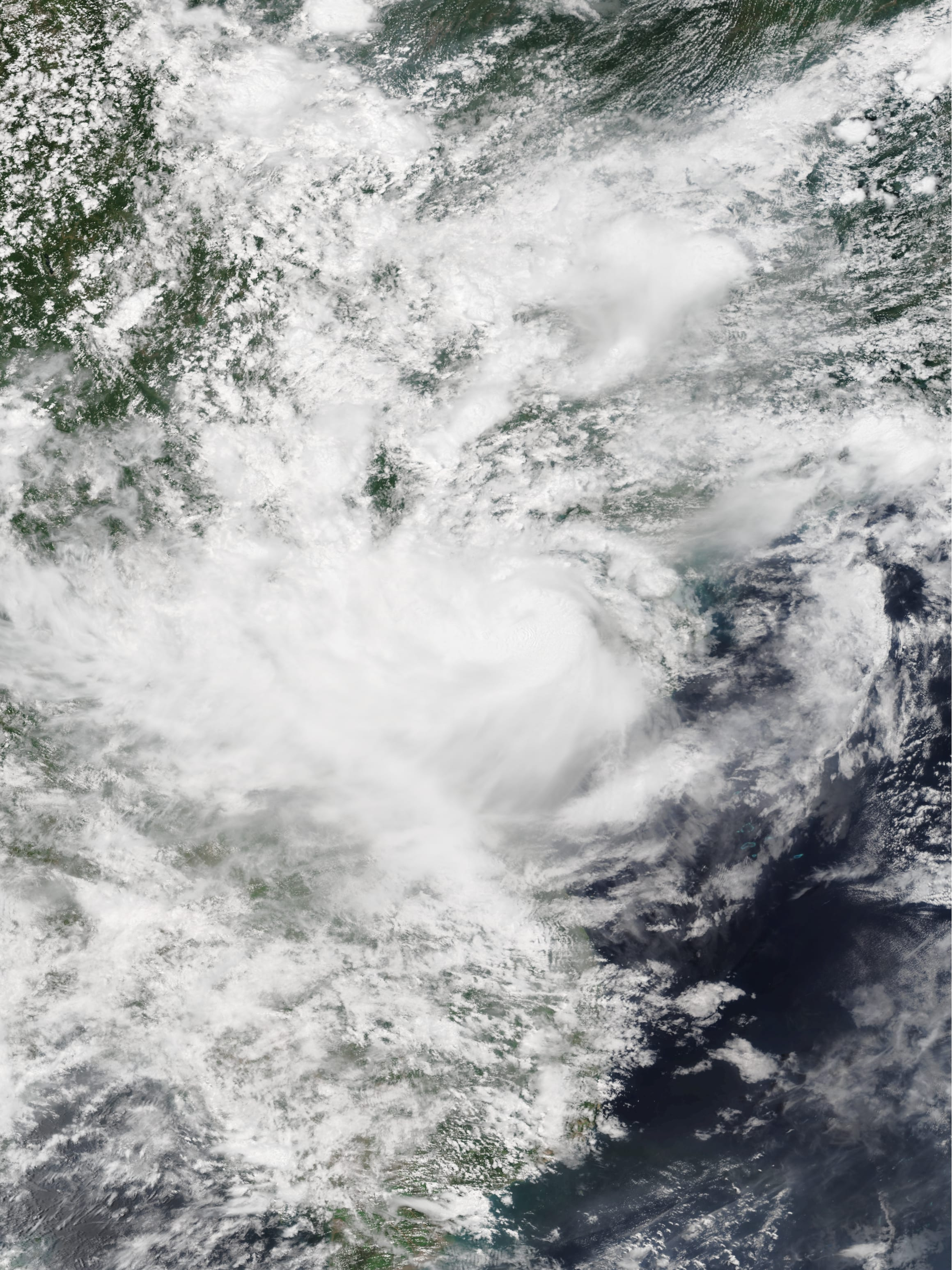
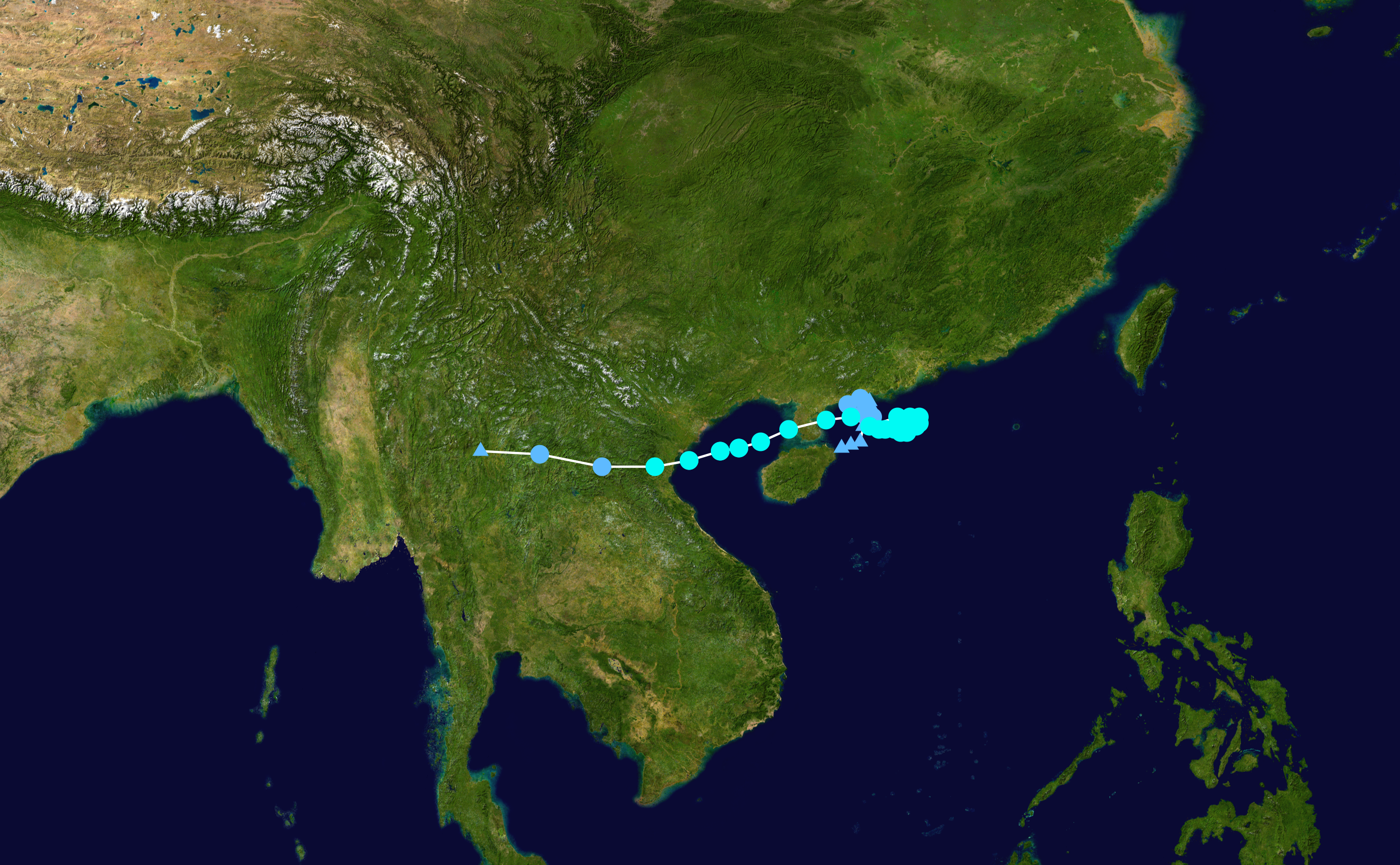
- Duration: August 9 – August 17
- Peak intensity: 85 km/h (50 mph) (10-min); 985 hPa (mbar)

On August 9, a tropical depression formed within the South China Sea. The system remained weak and remained stationary for a few days until the JTWC began tracking the system, giving it the designation 20W on August 12. On the next day, the JMA upgraded the system to a tropical storm, naming it Bebinca. The JTWC followed suit nine hours later as deep convection flared near its compact center. Despite consistent convection along with warm sea-surface temperatures, Bebinca remained weak for the next few days due to strong shear. By August 16, however, Bebinca began to undergo a phase of rapid intensification as its center was obscured by a central dense overcast, which resulted in the JMA briefly upgrading Bebinca to a severe tropical storm, though in post-analysis it was downgraded to a tropical storm. The JTWC analysed a few hours later that the system had reached peak intensity with 1-minute winds of 110 km/h (68 mph). After Bebinca made landfall, the system rapidly weakened and both agencies issued their final warnings on August 17, with the system fully dissipating on the same day.

Bebinca killed a total of 6 people, and total economic losses in South China were counted to be ¥2.31 billion (US$333 million). 13 people lost their lives in Vietnam and total damages were counted to be ₫786.55 billion (US$33.7 million).

=== Severe Tropical Storm Leepi ===
- Severe tropical storm (JMA)
- Category 1 typhoon (SSHWS)
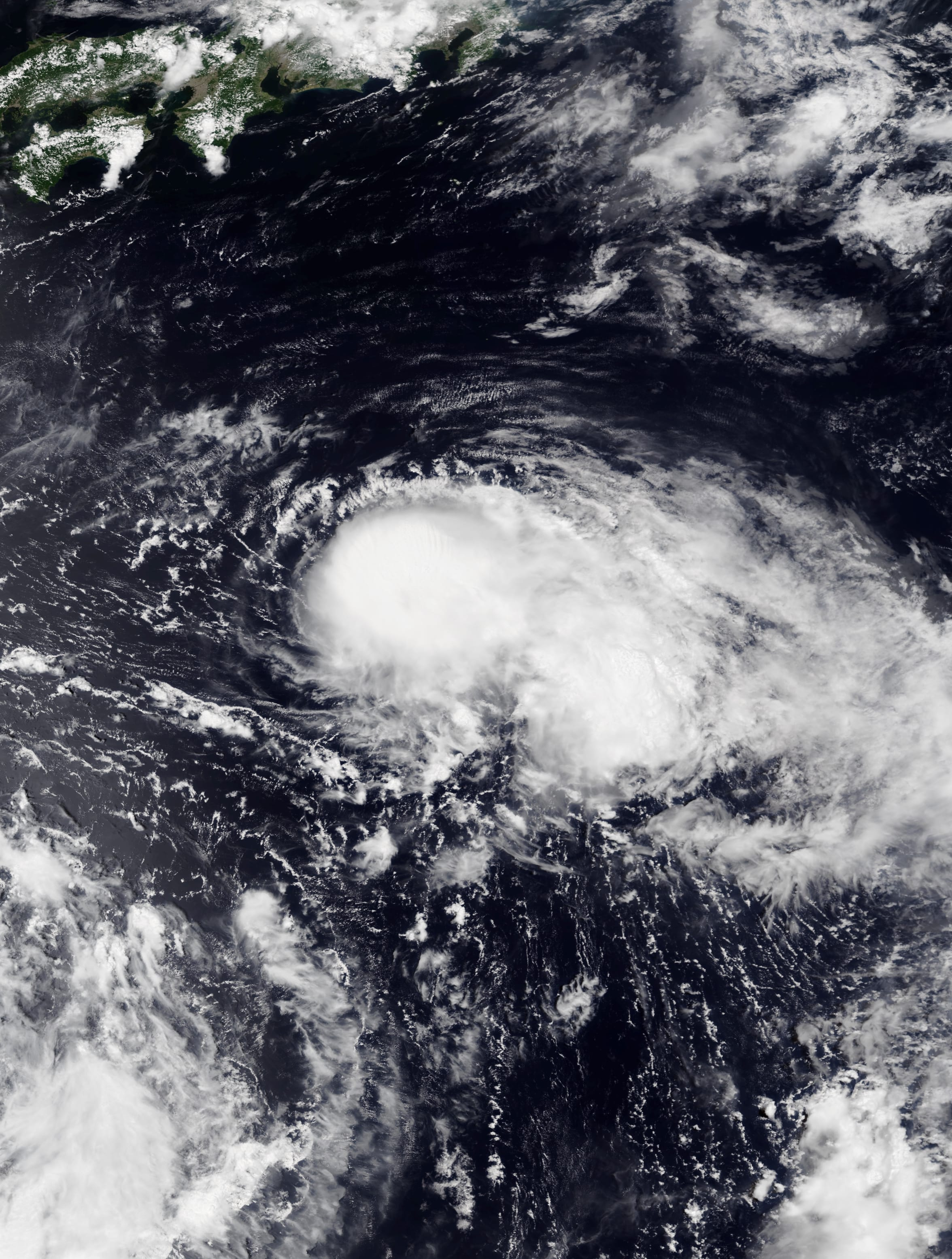
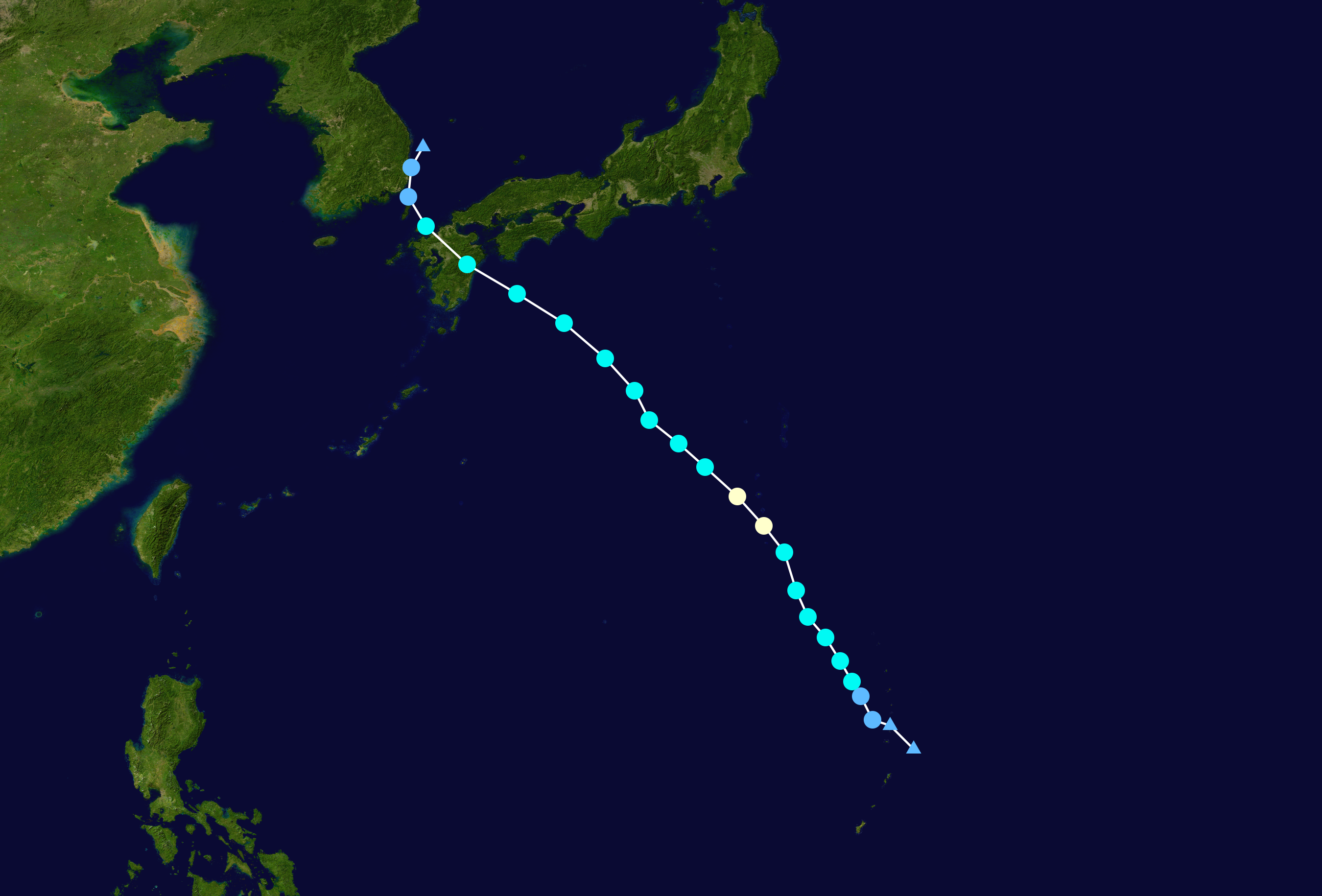
- Duration: August 10 – August 15
- Peak intensity: 95 km/h (60 mph) (10-min); 994 hPa (mbar)

On August 10, a tropical depression formed near the Mariana Islands, assigning the depression as 19W and on the next day at 12:00 UTC, the JMA upgraded it to a tropical storm, assigning it the name Leepi. By August 13, Leepi began to threaten Japan, and on August 14, Leepi intensified into a severe tropical storm, with the JTWC upgrading it to a Category 1 equivalent typhoon. Shortly before 03:00 JST (18:00 UTC) on August 15, Leepi made landfall over Hyūga, Miyazaki in Japan. Leepi was downgraded into a tropical depression and dissipated on August 15, though its remnants were still noted near Russia.

=== Tropical Storm Hector ===
- Tropical storm (JMA)
- Tropical storm (SSHWS)
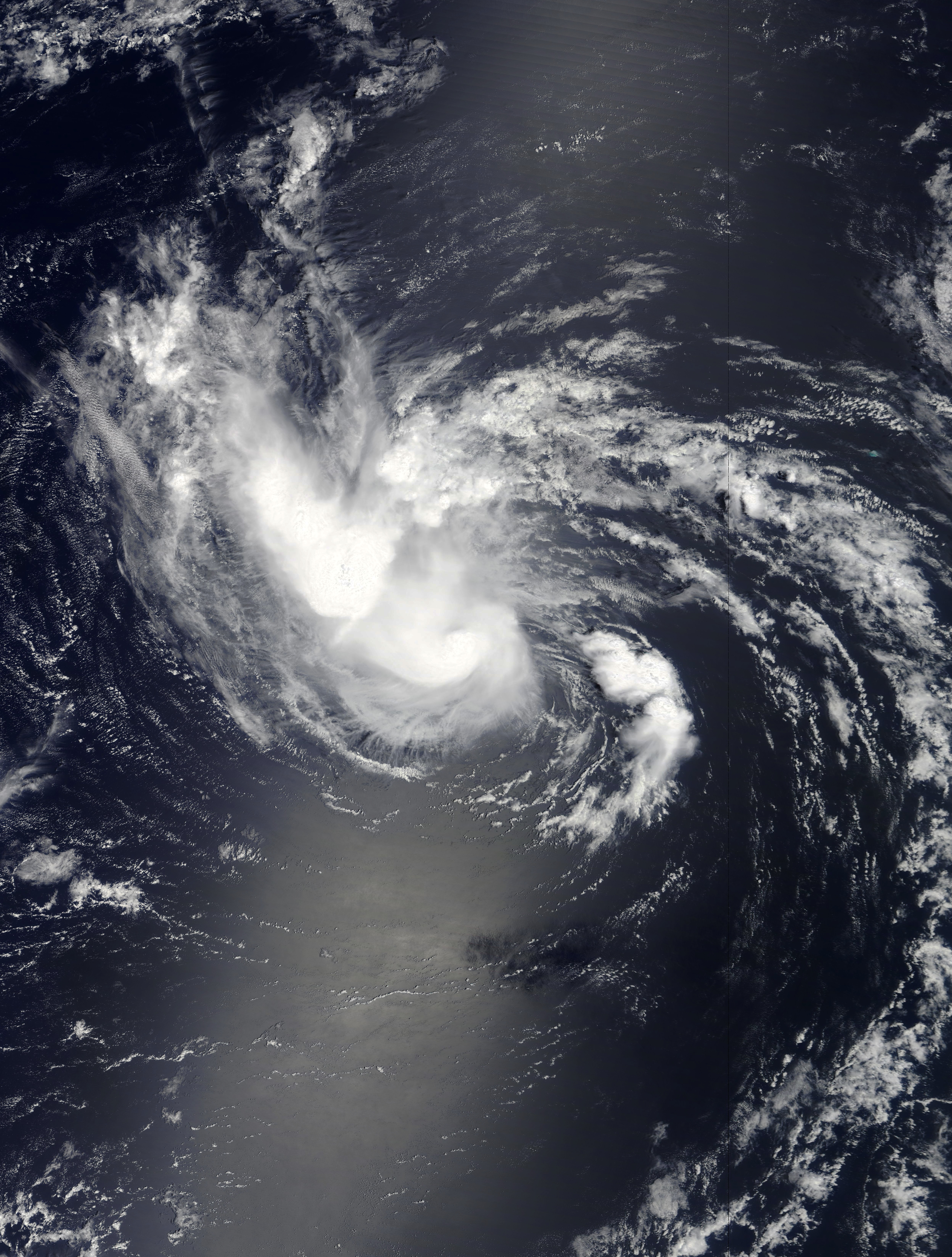
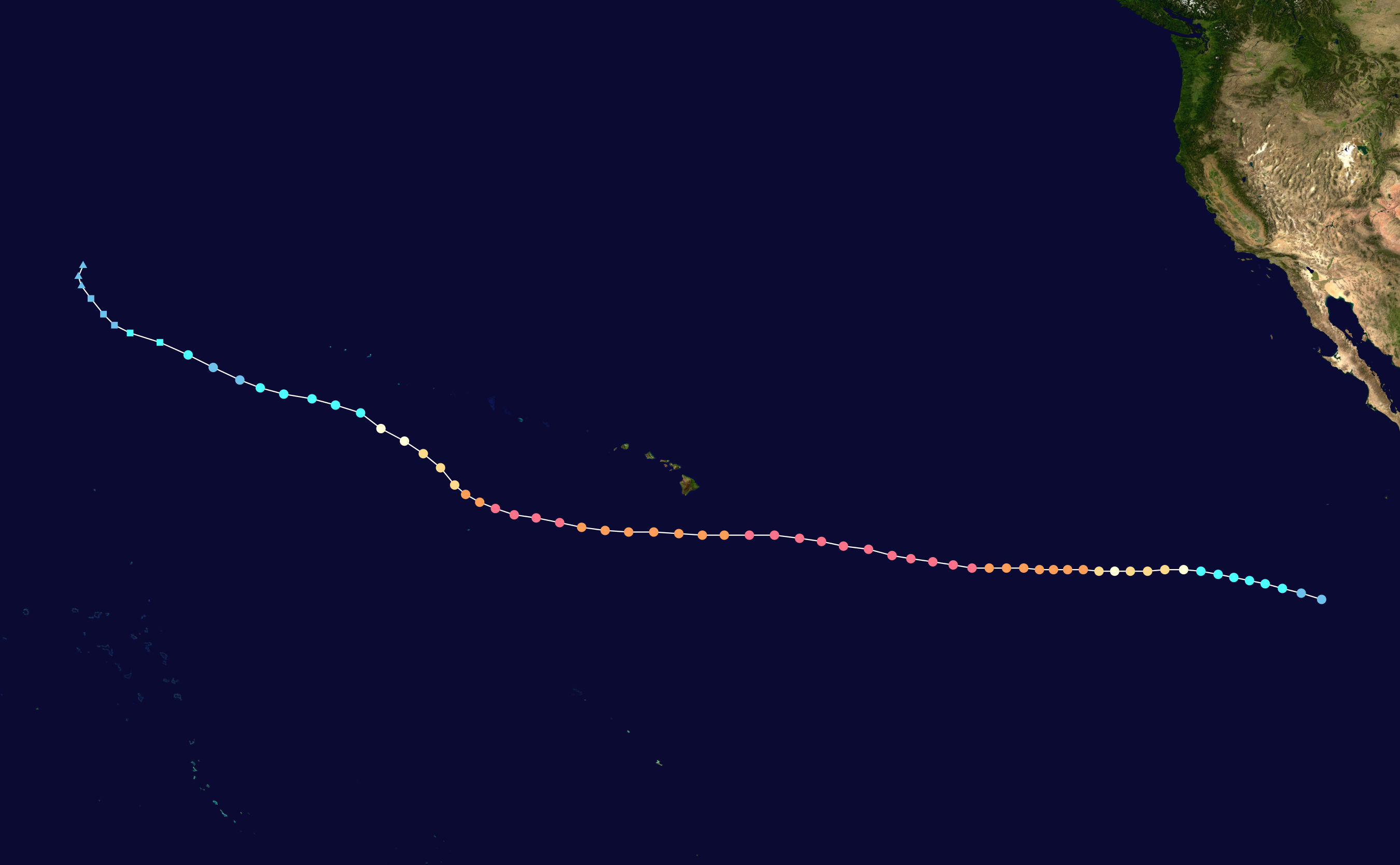
- Duration: August 13 (Entered basin) – August 16
- Peak intensity: 75 km/h (45 mph) (10-min); 998 hPa (mbar)

On August 13 at 18:00 UTC, both the JMA and the JTWC declared that Tropical Storm Hector has crossed the International Date Line and entered the West Pacific basin from the East Pacific basin. At this point, Hector was still located in a favorable environment with only moderate shear, though deep convection was limited as it only persisted just near its center. Due to an upper tropospheric trough cell located to the west of Hector, the storm failed to intensify and began to weaken. The JTWC downgraded Hector to a tropical depression after the system rapidly entered an area of high vertical wind shear. By the early hours of August 15, both agencies issued their final warnings on Hector, mentioning that Hector's low-level circulation had become elongated and that the storm already transitioned into a subtropical cyclone. The JMA, however, continued to monitor the system until 00:00 UTC on August 17.

=== Tropical Storm Rumbia ===
- Tropical storm (JMA)
- Tropical storm (SSHWS)
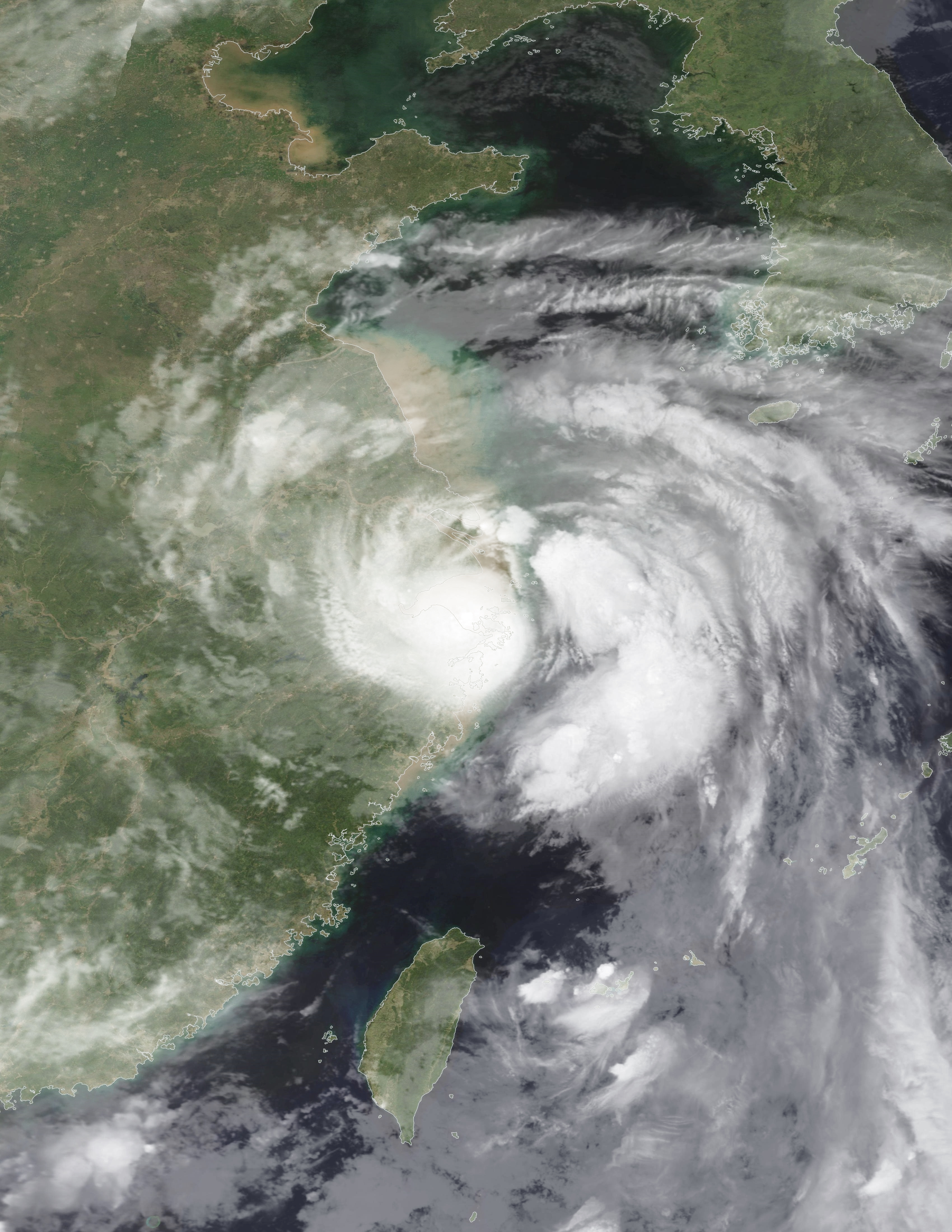
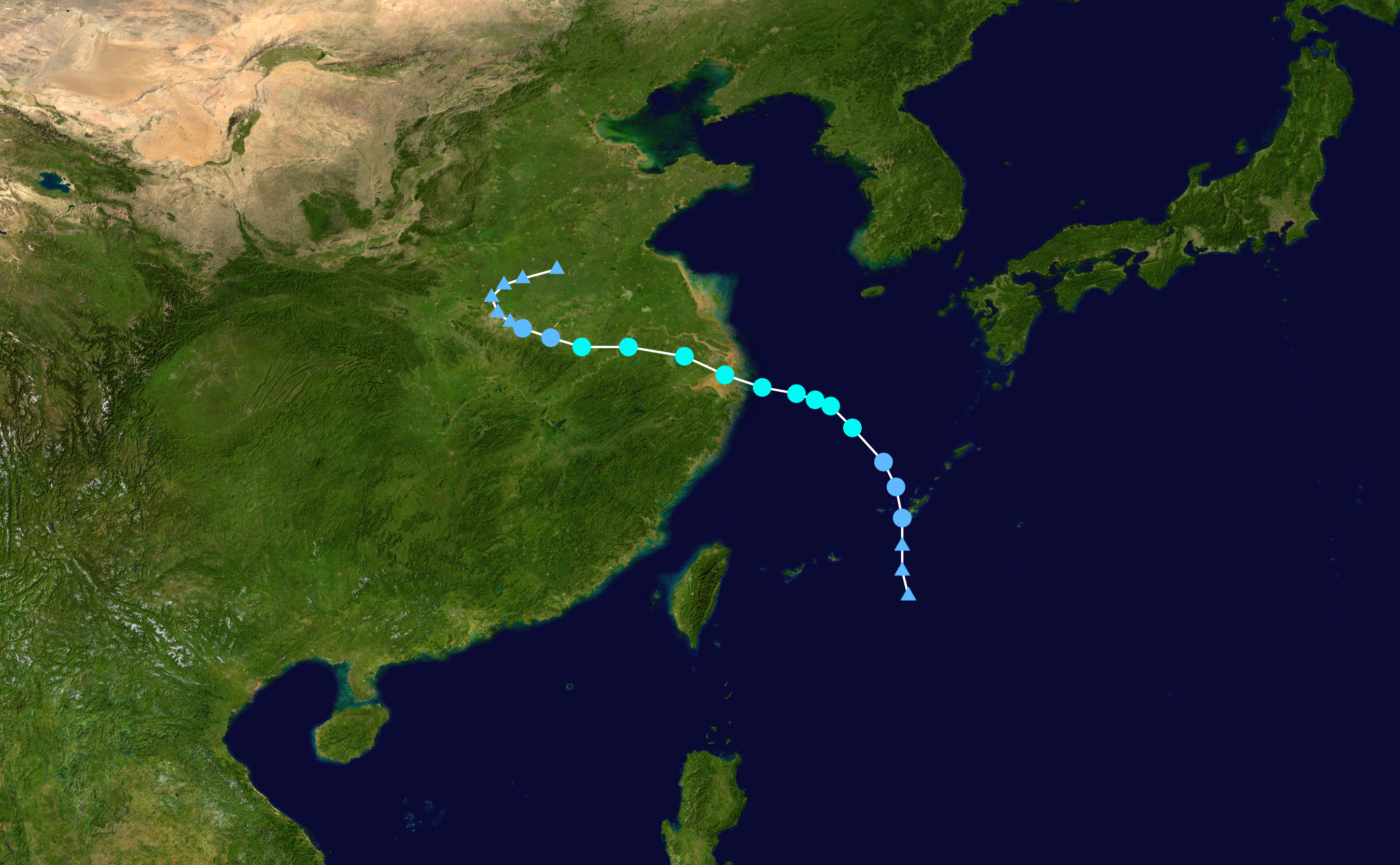
- Duration: August 14 – August 18
- Peak intensity: 85 km/h (50 mph) (10-min); 985 hPa (mbar)

On August 15, a tropical depression in the East China Sea intensified into a tropical storm, being given the name Rumbia by the JMA. Shortly after reaching peak intensity over the Hangzhou Bay on August 16, Rumbia made landfall over Pudong New Area, Shanghai, China at around 04:05 CST on August 17 (20:05 UTC), becoming the third tropical storm to hit Shanghai in 2018.

Rumbia killed a total of 53 people in East China and total economic losses were counted to be CN¥36.91 billion (US$5.36 billion). Shouguang received 174.7 mm (6.88 in) of rain and was particularly hard-hit, with 10,000 homes destroyed and 13 people killed. The city is regarded as the nation's greatest producer of vegetables and agriculture suffered tremendous losses; 200,000 greenhouses sustained damage. Upstream on the Mi River rainfall reached 241.6 mm (9.51 in) and caused significant flooding. Water levels at three reservoirs rose dangerously high, prompting officials to release excess water to avoid collapse. The resulting increase downstream exacerbated the flooding in Shouguang. The extratropical remnants of Rumbia were last tracked northeast of Hokkaido before dissipating off the coast of the Russian Far East.

=== Typhoon Soulik ===
- Very strong typhoon (JMA)
- Category 3 typhoon (SSHWS)
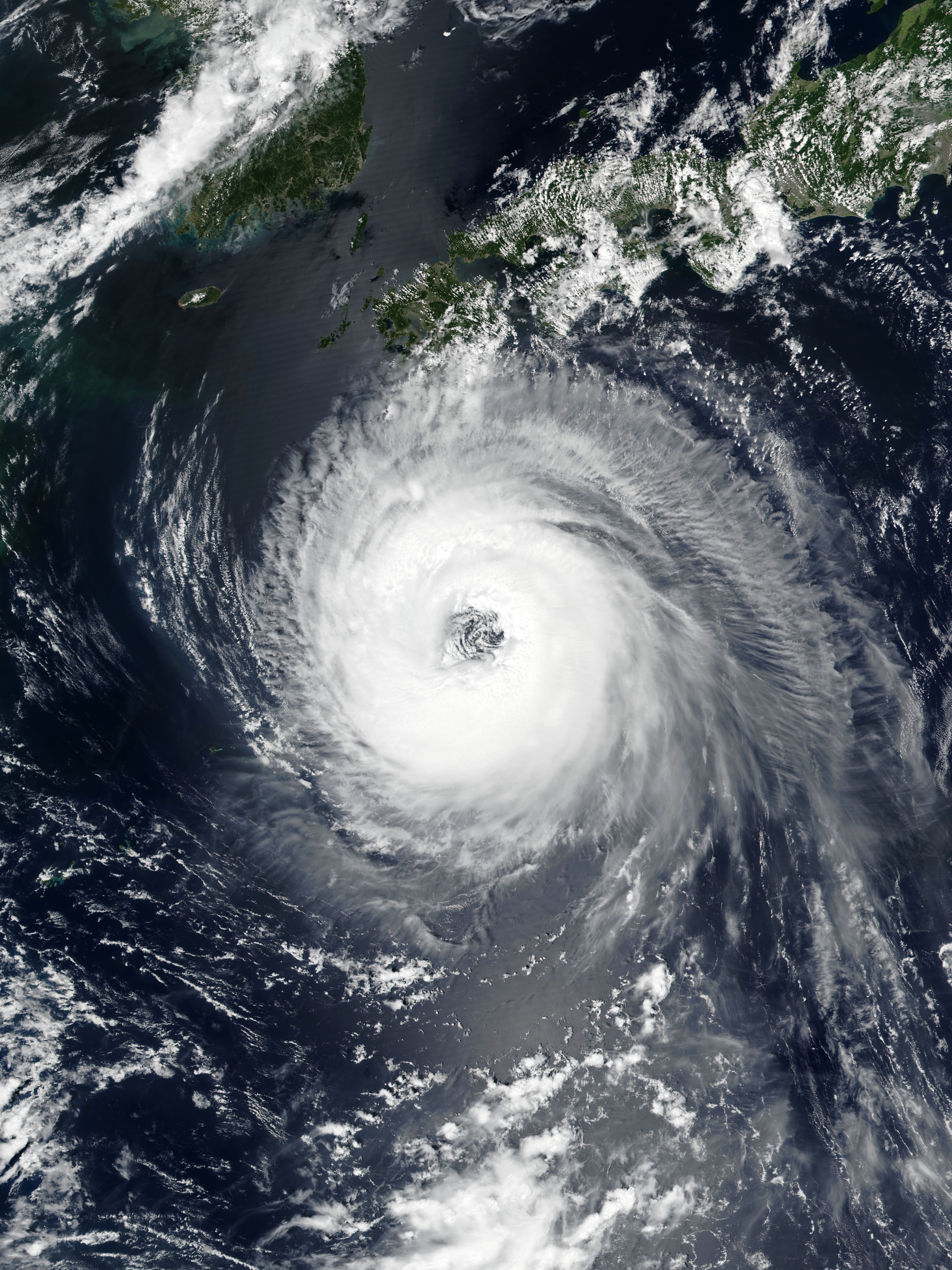
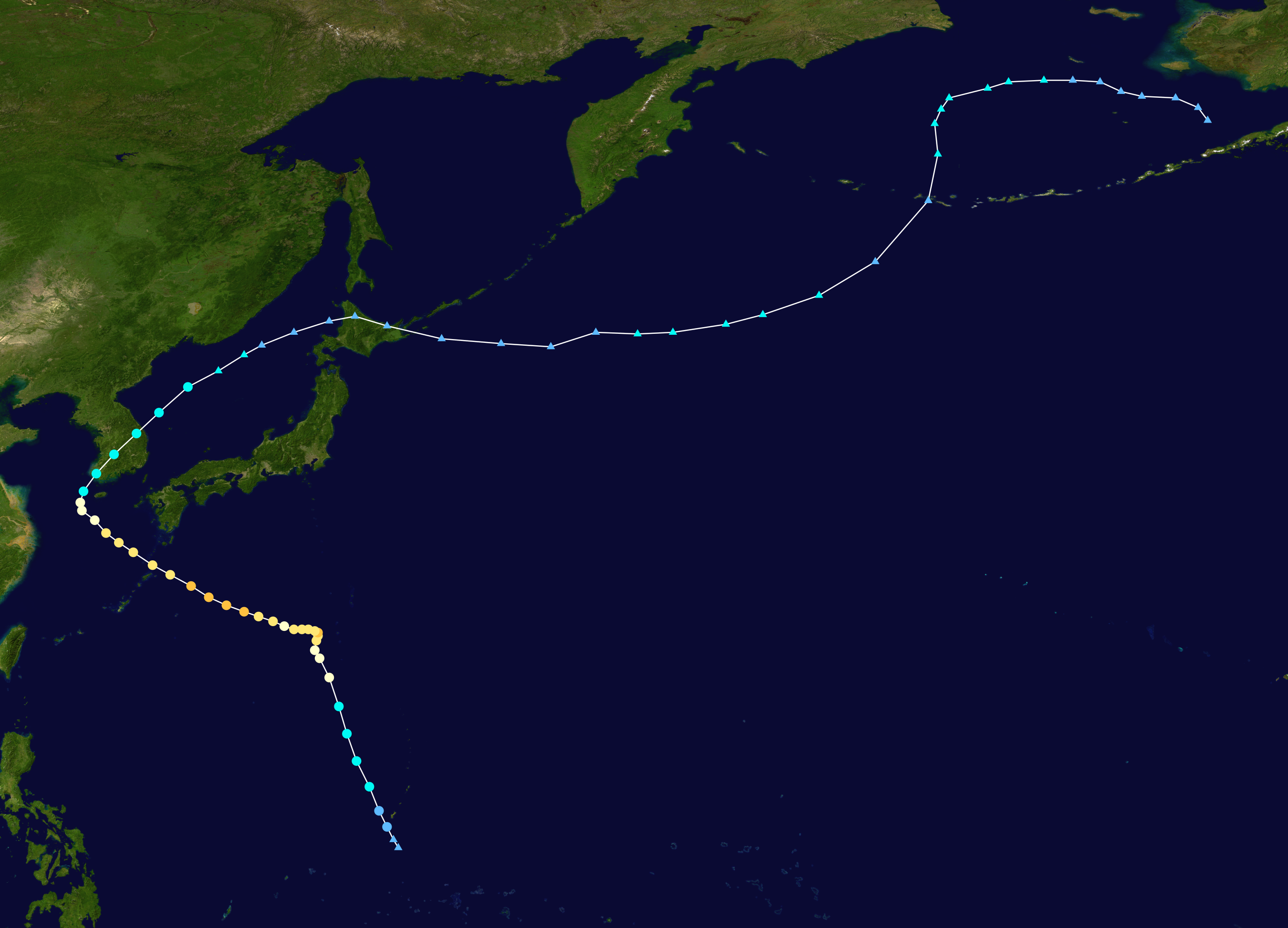
- Duration: August 15 – August 24
- Peak intensity: 155 km/h (100 mph) (10-min); 950 hPa (mbar)

A low-pressure area in the Philippine Sea organized into a tropical depression late on August 15. The JTWC followed suit at 00:00 UTC at August 16 and was designated as 22W. Later on that day, the JMA upgraded 22W to tropical storm and it was given the international name Soulik. On August 17, JMA upgraded Soulik to a typhoon, marking the sixth typhoon of the season. Then Soulik rapidly intensified onto a severe typhoon, and on the next day, Soulik reached its peak intensity, with winds of 165 km/h (103 mph), and remained that intensity for several days. It also began to display some annular characteristics. After passing the Ryukyu Islands early on 22 August, the storm gradually weakened due to low sea-surface temperatures. On August 23, Soulik made landfall over Haenam County, South Jeolla Province of South Korea at around 23:00 KST (14:00 UTC).

Total damage in South Korea were at ₩50.7 billion (US$45 million). Economic loss in Northeast China were counted to be CN¥550 million (US$79.9 million). Flooding in North Korea triggered by Soulik killed 86 people.

=== Typhoon Cimaron ===
- Very strong typhoon (JMA)
- Category 4 typhoon (SSHWS)
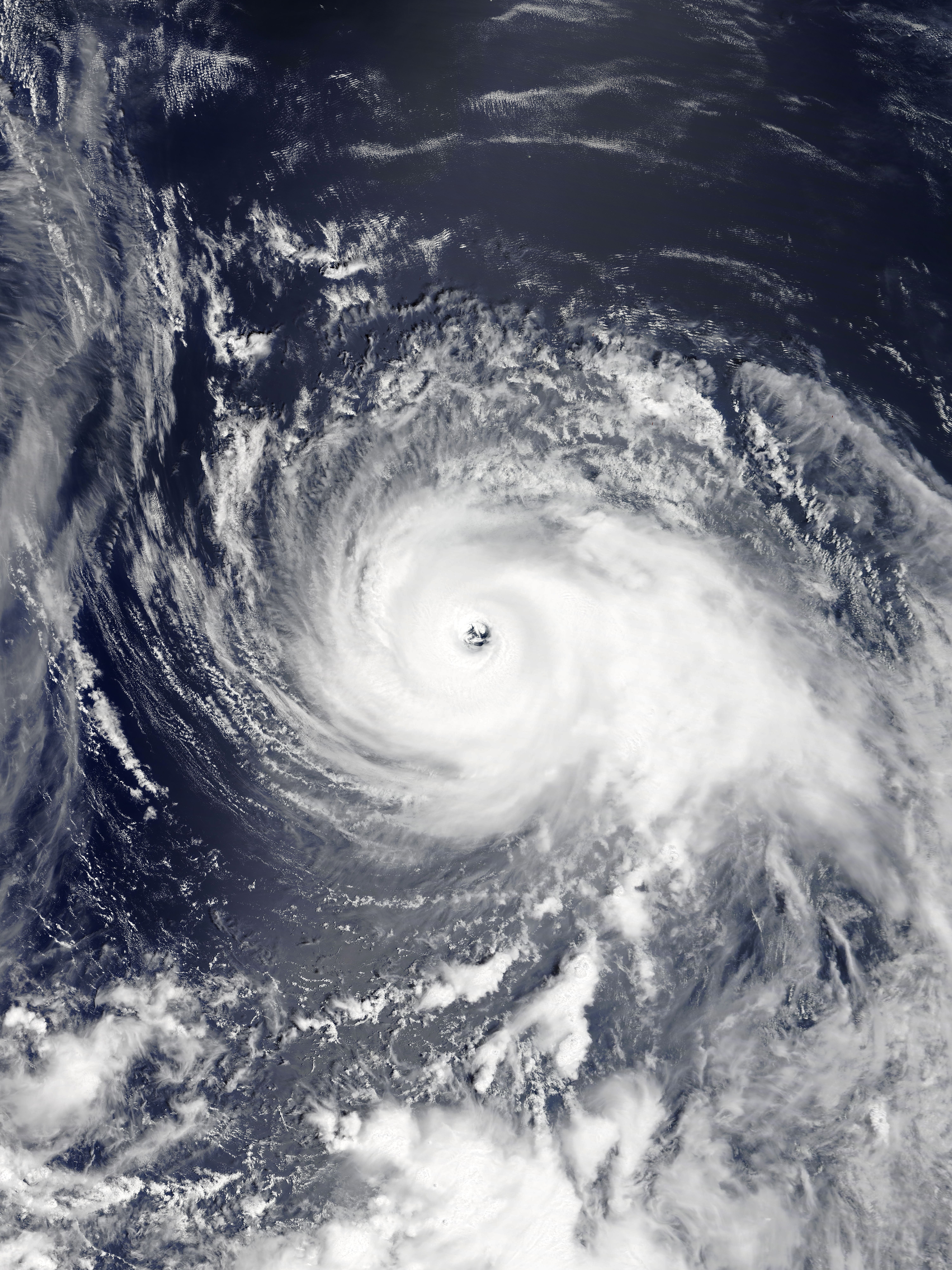
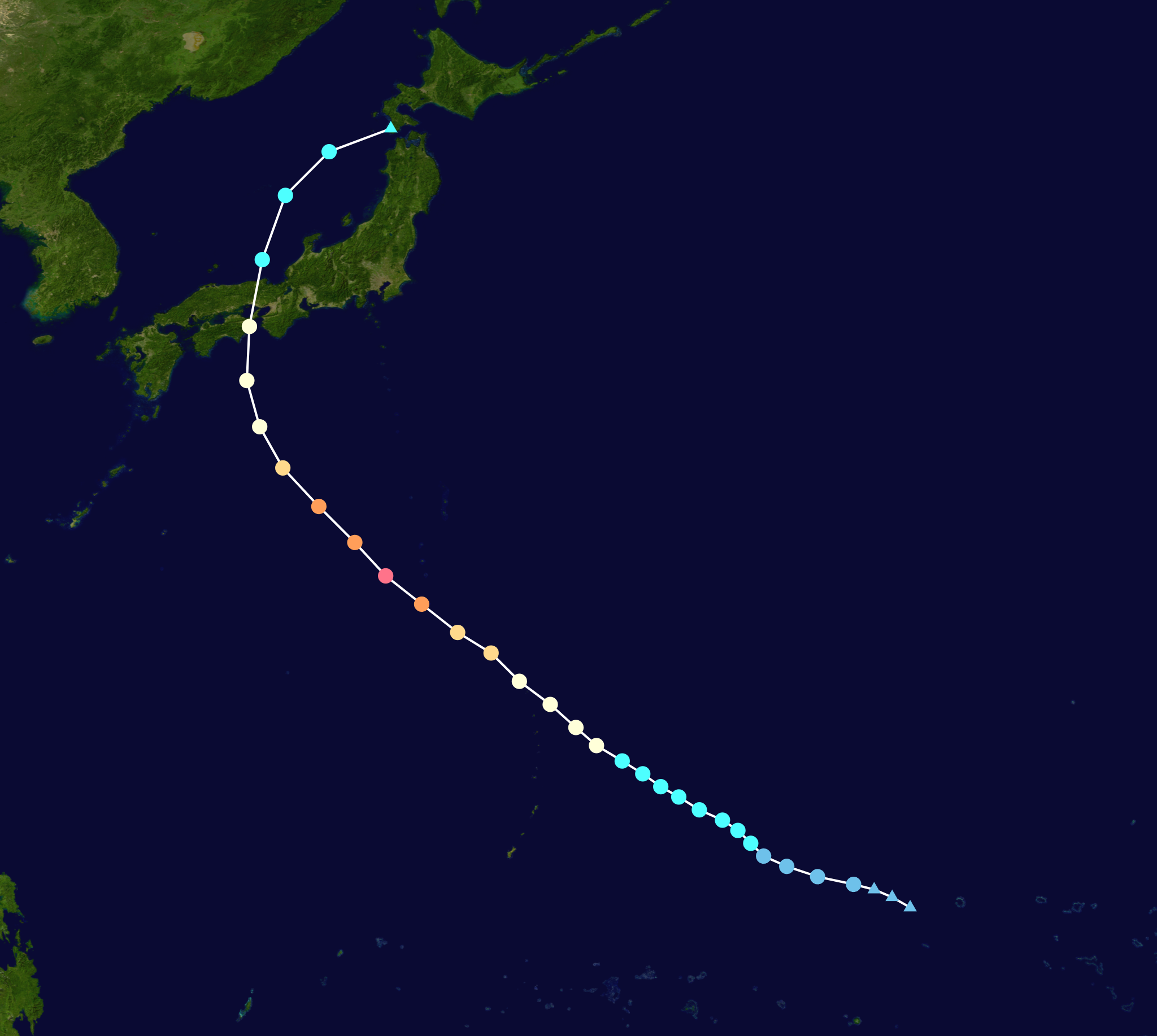
- Duration: August 17 – August 24
- Peak intensity: 155 km/h (100 mph) (10-min); 950 hPa (mbar)

On August 17, a tropical depression formed near the Marshall Islands. It was named Tropical Storm Cimaron a day later. Soon after, it was upgraded to a Severe Tropical Storm. Cimaron gradually intensified over the course from August 20–22. Typhoon Cimaron threatened Southern Japan, at the same time as Typhoon Soulik ravaged the area. Typhoon Cimaron intensified to reach its peak intensity at Category 4 severe typhoon with 130 mph winds before its landfall on Japan on August 23 over the southern part of Tokushima Prefecture, Japan at around 21:00 JST (12:00 UTC). Typhoon Cimaron emerged off the north coast as a weak tropical storm, before becoming extratropical and headed into Northern Japan again. Cimaron was a significant Category 4 storm, and the 12th typhoon to strike Japan in 2018 and was surpassed by Typhoon Jebi a month later. Then, it made landfall over Himeji, Hyōgo Prefecture shortly before 24:00 JST (15:00 UTC).

Agricultural damage in Kyoto, Wakayama and Shiga Prefecture were about JP¥3.41 billion (US$30.6 million).

=== Tropical Depression 24W (Luis) ===
- Tropical depression (JMA)
- Tropical depression (SSHWS)
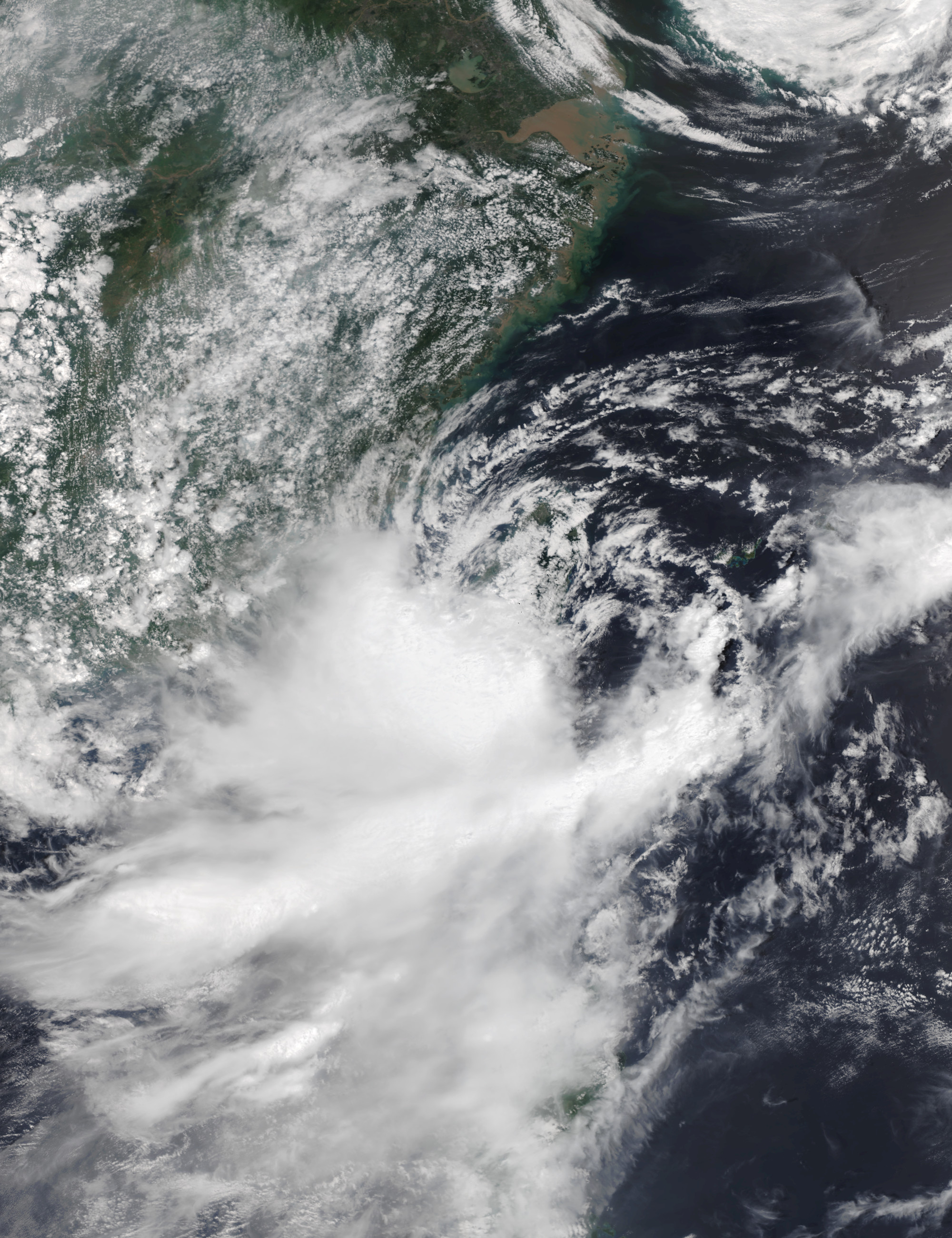
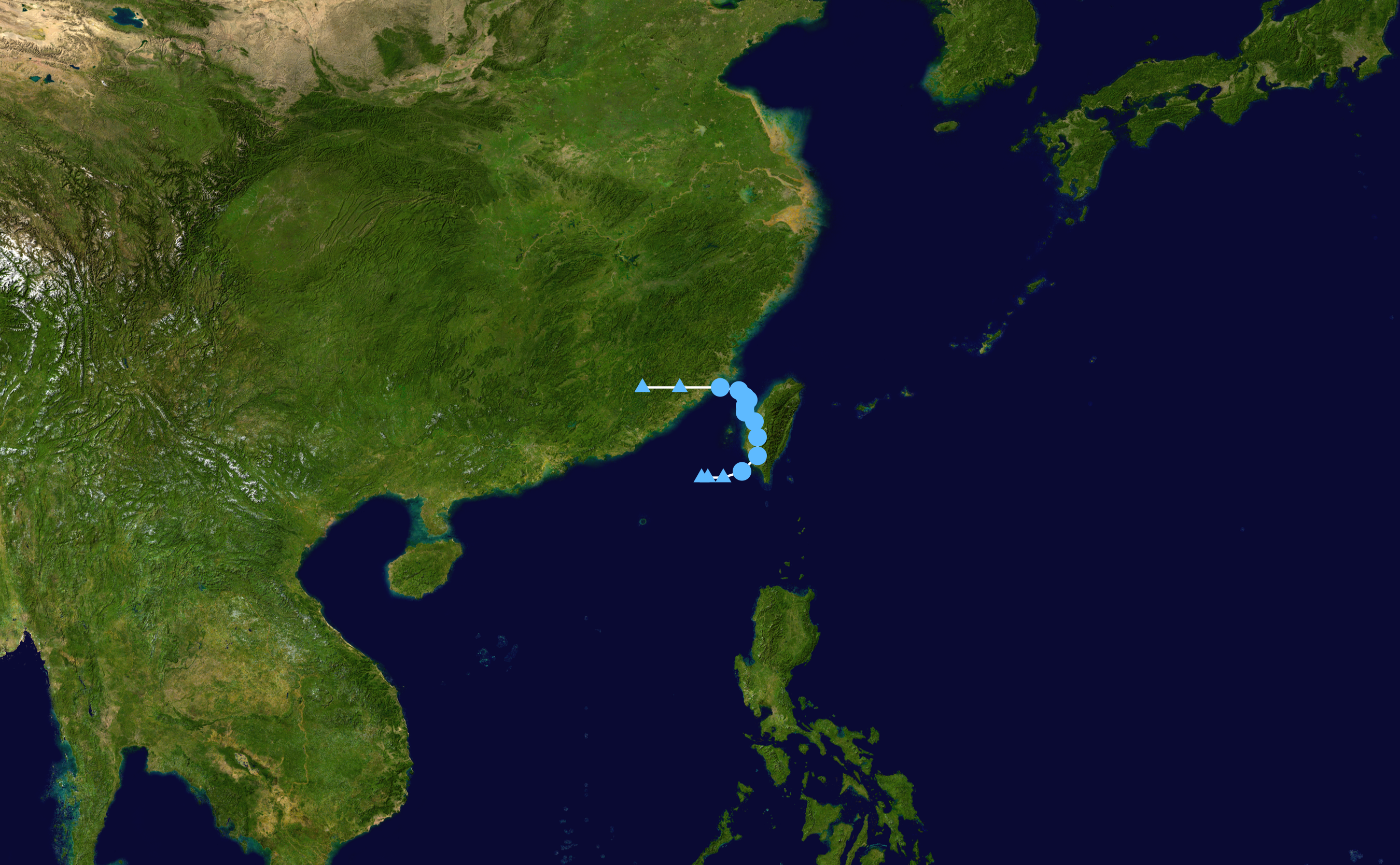
- Duration: August 21 – August 26
- Peak intensity: 55 km/h (35 mph) (10-min); 996 hPa (mbar)

A tropical depression formed at the South China Sea near Taiwan. Despite entering an area of high wind shear, the system was in a favorable environment, so the JTWC and the PAGASA followed suit, with the JTWC naming it 24W, and the PAGASA named it Luis. 24W then made landfall over Fujian, China shortly after 08:00 CST (00:00 UTC) on August 25, and degenerated into a low-pressure area on next day. The JMA would continue monitoring the system until the next day.

Tropical Depression 24W killed 7 people and caused NT$1.022 billion (US$34 million) of damage in Taiwan.

=== Typhoon Jebi (Maymay) ===
- Violent typhoon (JMA)
- Category 5 super typhoon (SSHWS)
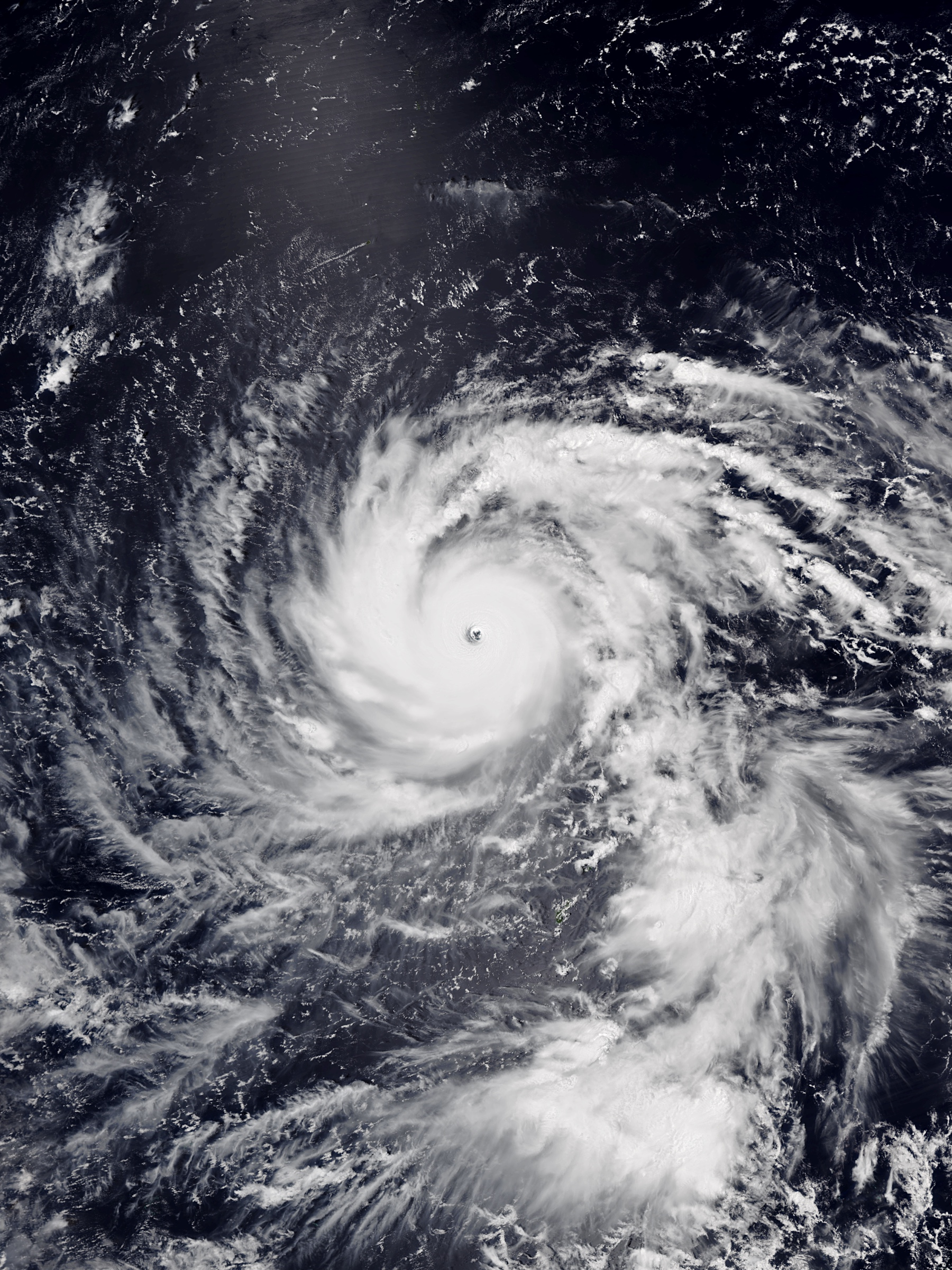
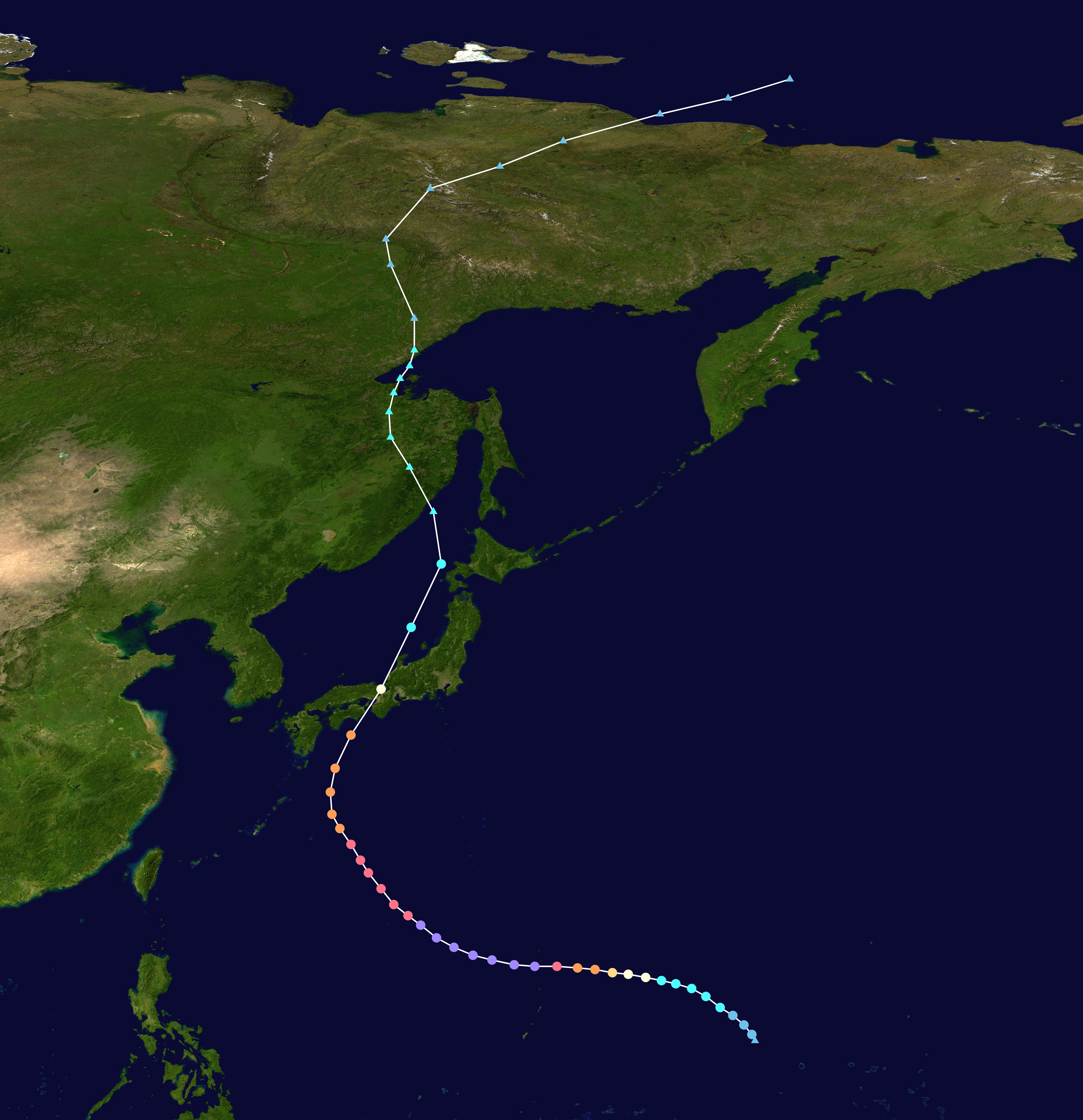
- Duration: August 26 – September 4
- Peak intensity: 195 km/h (120 mph) (10-min); 915 hPa (mbar)

A low-pressure system formed near the Marshall Islands on early August 25, developing and being upgraded to a tropical depression on August 27 by the Japan Meteorological Agency (JMA). There was a persistent deep convection in the system which lead to the upgrade to a tropical storm by the JMA and was given the name 'Jebi'. On August 29, the storm abruptly underwent rapid intensification and became the third super typhoon and the second category 5 of the season. On September 4, a weakened but still powerful Jebi made landfall over the southern part of Tokushima Prefecture at around 12:00 JST (03:00 UTC) before moving over Osaka Bay and making another landfall at around Kobe, Hyōgo Prefecture at around 14:00 JST (05:00 UTC). Osaka was hit badly with a maximum wind gust of 209 km/h recorded at Kansai International Airport and 171 km/h at Osaka city's weather station, where the minimum sea level pressure (962 mb) was the lowest since 1961's record of 937 mb (Typhoon Nancy) and the fifth lowest on record. A 3.29 metre storm surge led to flooding along the Osaka Bay, including Kansai International Airport, where the runways were flooded and some airport facilities were damaged by wind and water. Osaka's iconic Universal Studios Japan was also closed during the event of the typhoon. Wakayama also recorded a maximum wind gust of 207 km/h. Jebi then moved over Kyoto which wrecked more havoc. Multiple shrines were closed during the duration of the typhoon. Kyoto Station received a lot of damage, the glass above the atrium covering the central exit, shops and hotel, collapsed, narrowly missing a few by centimeters. The typhoon ultimately emerged into the Sea of Japan shortly after 15:00 JST (06:00 UTC). Simultaneously, a cold front formed southwest of the typhoon, initiating the beginning of an extratropical transition on September 4. On September 5, after JTWC issued a final warning at 00:00 JST (15:00 UTC), Jebi was downgraded to a severe tropical storm at 03:00 JST (18:00 UTC) when it was located near the Shakotan Peninsula of Hokkaido. The storm completely transitioned into a storm-force extratropical cyclone off the coast of Primorsky Krai, Russia shortly before 10:00 VLAT (09:00 JST, 00:00 UTC). Later, the extratropical cyclone moved inland. The terrain of Khabarovsk Krai contributed to the steadily weakening trend as the system moved inland northwestward and then northward; extratropical low passed northeast of Ayan early on September 7. Jebi's extratropical remnant continued northward and then turned northeastward, before dissipating early on September 9 over the Arctic Ocean.

Jebi was the strongest storm to hit Japan since Typhoon Yancy of 1993. In total, Jebi killed 17 people and inflicted around US$15 billion. 11 deaths were reported from Japan and 6 deaths were reported from Taiwan.

=== Typhoon Mangkhut (Ompong) ===
- Violent typhoon (JMA)
- Category 5 super typhoon (SSHWS)
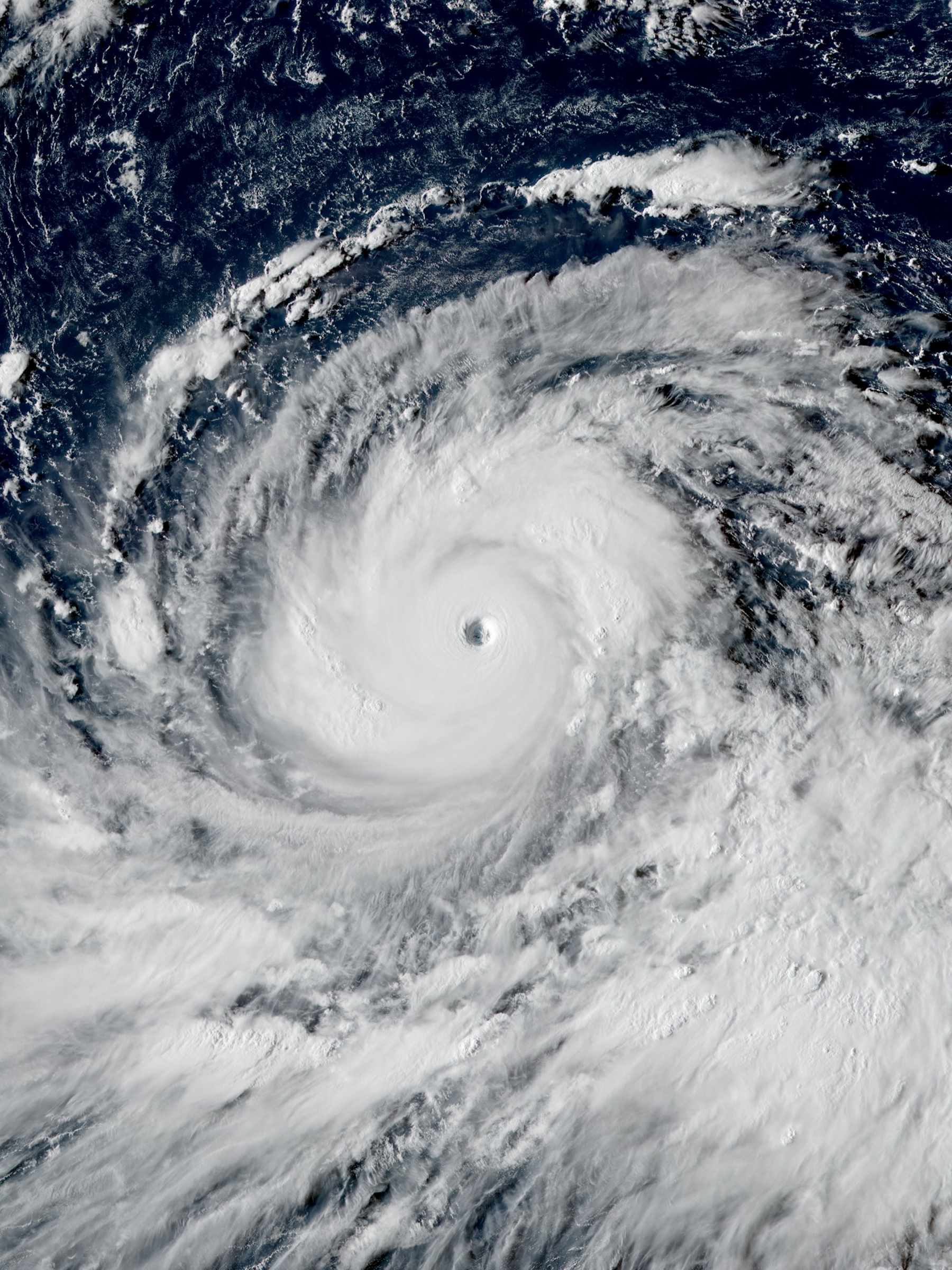
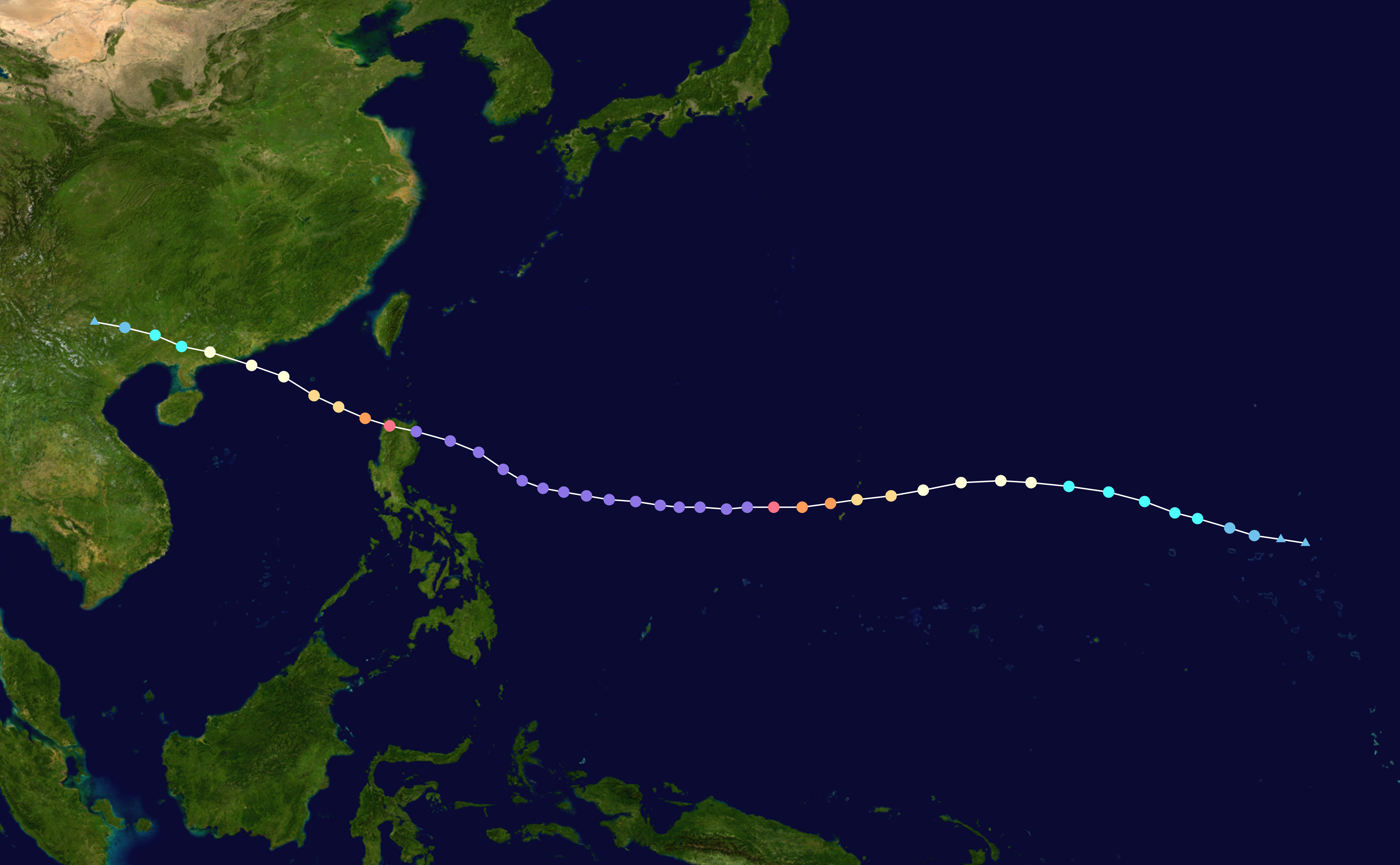
- Duration: September 6 – September 17
- Peak intensity: 205 km/h (125 mph) (10-min); 905 hPa (mbar)

On September 6, a tropical depression formed near the Marshall Islands. However, operationally, the Japan Meteorological Agency (JMA) did not initiate advisories on the system until September 7. The JTWC followed suit at 03:00 UTC on September 7, and classified the system as Tropical Depression 26W. Late on the same day, the system strengthened into a tropical storm, and the JMA named the system Mangkhut. By September 11, Mangkhut became a typhoon, and made landfall on the islands of Rota, Northern Mariana Islands. On September 12, at 3 pm Philippine Standard Time, Mangkhut entered the PAR as a Category 5 super typhoon, and accordingly, PAGASA named the storm Ompong. The JTWC noted additional strengthening on September 12, and assessed Mangkhut to have reached its peak intensity at 18:00 UTC, with maximum one-minute sustained winds of 285 km/h (177 mph). On September 13, the Philippine Government initiated evacuations for residents in the typhoon's expected path. Late on September 14, Mangkhut made landfall in Baggao, Cagayan as a Category 5-equivalent super typhoon, with 1-minute sustained winds of 165 miles per hour (266 km/h). While moving inland, Mangkhut weakened into a strong Category 4-equivalent super typhoon, and soon weakened further into a Category 2 typhoon. A large eye then appeared and the system slowly strengthened into a Category 3 typhoon, as the storm moved over Hong Kong. As Mangkhut made its final landfall, it weakened into a weak Category 1 typhoon and maintained its intensity inland with deep convection, before subsequently weakening further. Late on September 17, Mangkhut dissipated over Guangxi, China.

Hong Kong Observatory initiated Hurricane Signal No. 10 around 09:40 HKT (00:40 UTC), the first time since Typhoon Hato of the previous year. As of September 23, at least 134 fatalities have been attributed to Mangkhut, including 127 in the Philippines, 6 in mainland China, and 1 in Taiwan. As of October 5, the NDRRMC estimated that Mangkhut caused ₱33.9 billion (US$627 million) in damages in the Philippines, with assessments continuing.

=== Tropical Storm Barijat (Neneng) ===
- Tropical storm (JMA)
- Tropical storm (SSHWS)
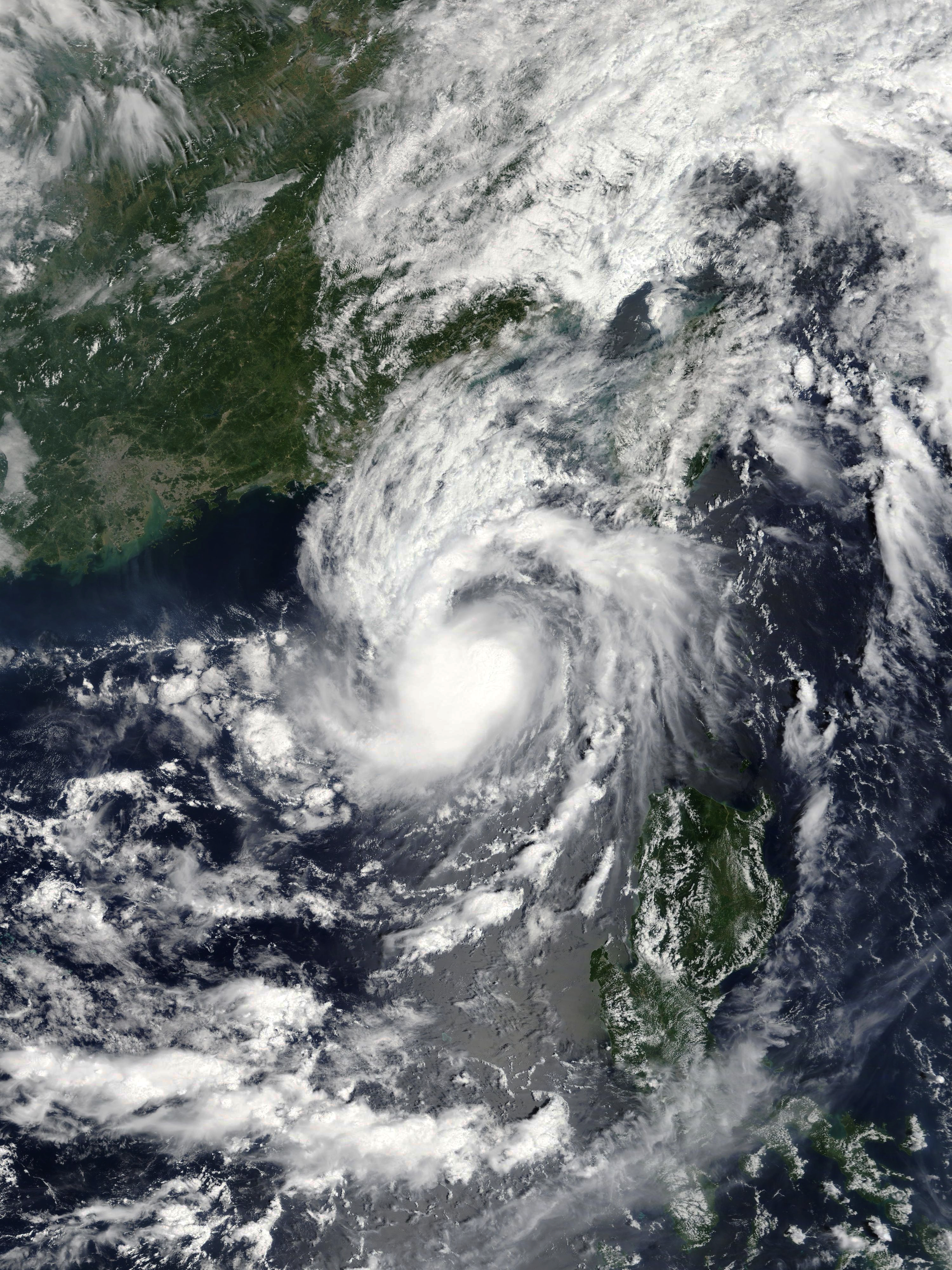
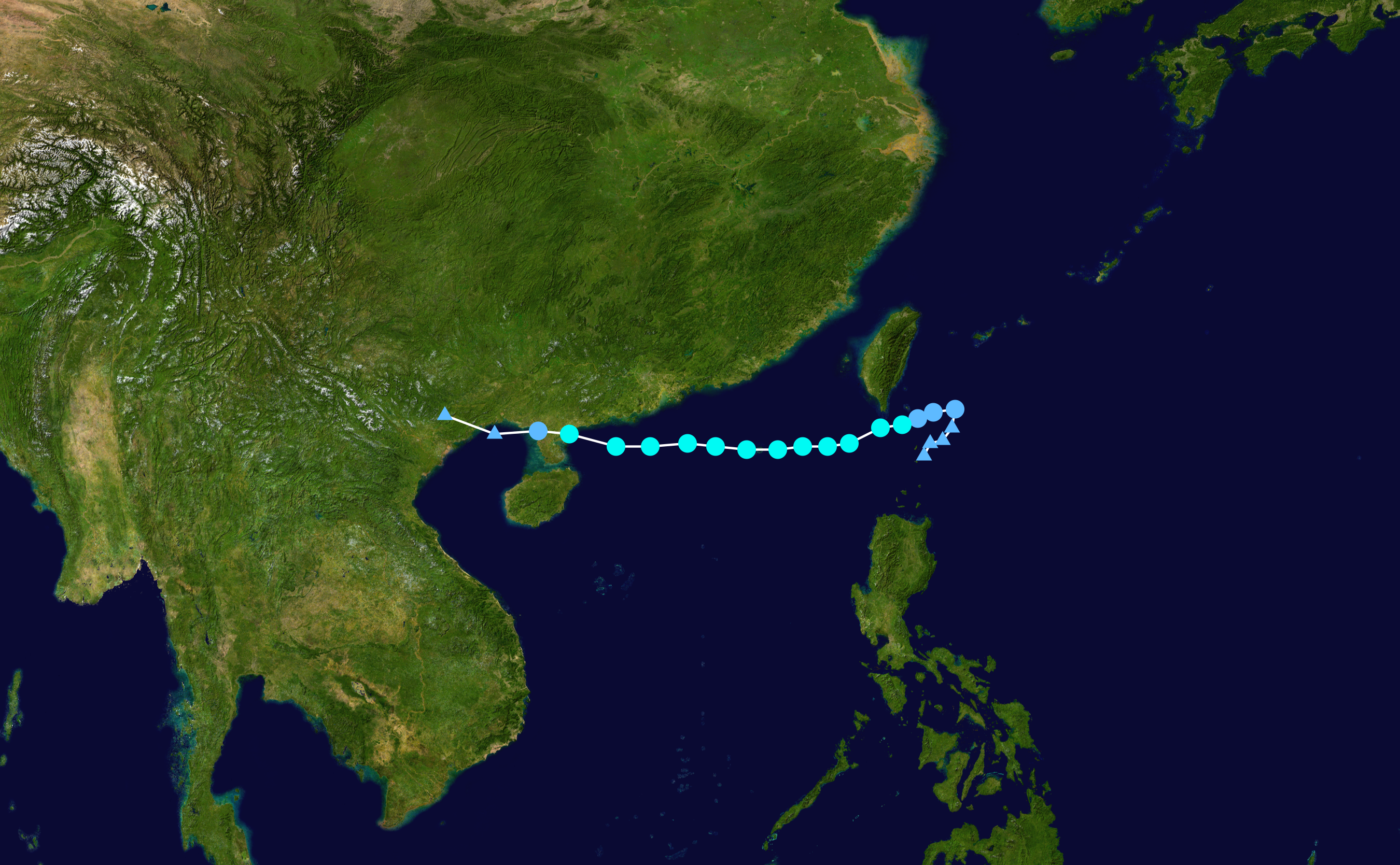
- Duration: September 8 – September 13
- Peak intensity: 75 km/h (45 mph) (10-min); 998 hPa (mbar)

On September 8, a tropical depression formed near Batanes in the Philippines. The storm was named Tropical Depression Neneng by PAGASA, with Batanes placed under TCWS #1. By the next day, Neneng exited the PAR and became a tropical storm, with the JMA assigning the name Barijat to the storm, while TCWS were raised in the absence of the storm. Over the next 2 days, Tropical Storm Barijat moved westward across the South China Sea, reaching its peak intensity with 10-minute maximum sustained wind speeds of 85 km/h on the night of September 11. On September 13, Tropical Storm Barijat (Neneng) made landfall on the Leizhou Peninsula, near the area where Tropical Storm Son-tinh (Henry) had made landfall 2 months ago, before making a second landfall on northern Vietnam later on the same day. During the evening of September 13, Barijat became a remnant low, dissipating on the next day.

Tropical Storm Barijat made a dozen landslides over Batanes, which increased the risk of major landslides and major flooding in the saturated soil influenced by this storm and later by Mangkhut (Ompong). No deaths were reported throughout its path, however, damages in China were at ¥50 million (US$7.3 million).

=== Typhoon Trami (Paeng) ===
- Violent typhoon (JMA)
- Category 5 super typhoon (SSHWS)
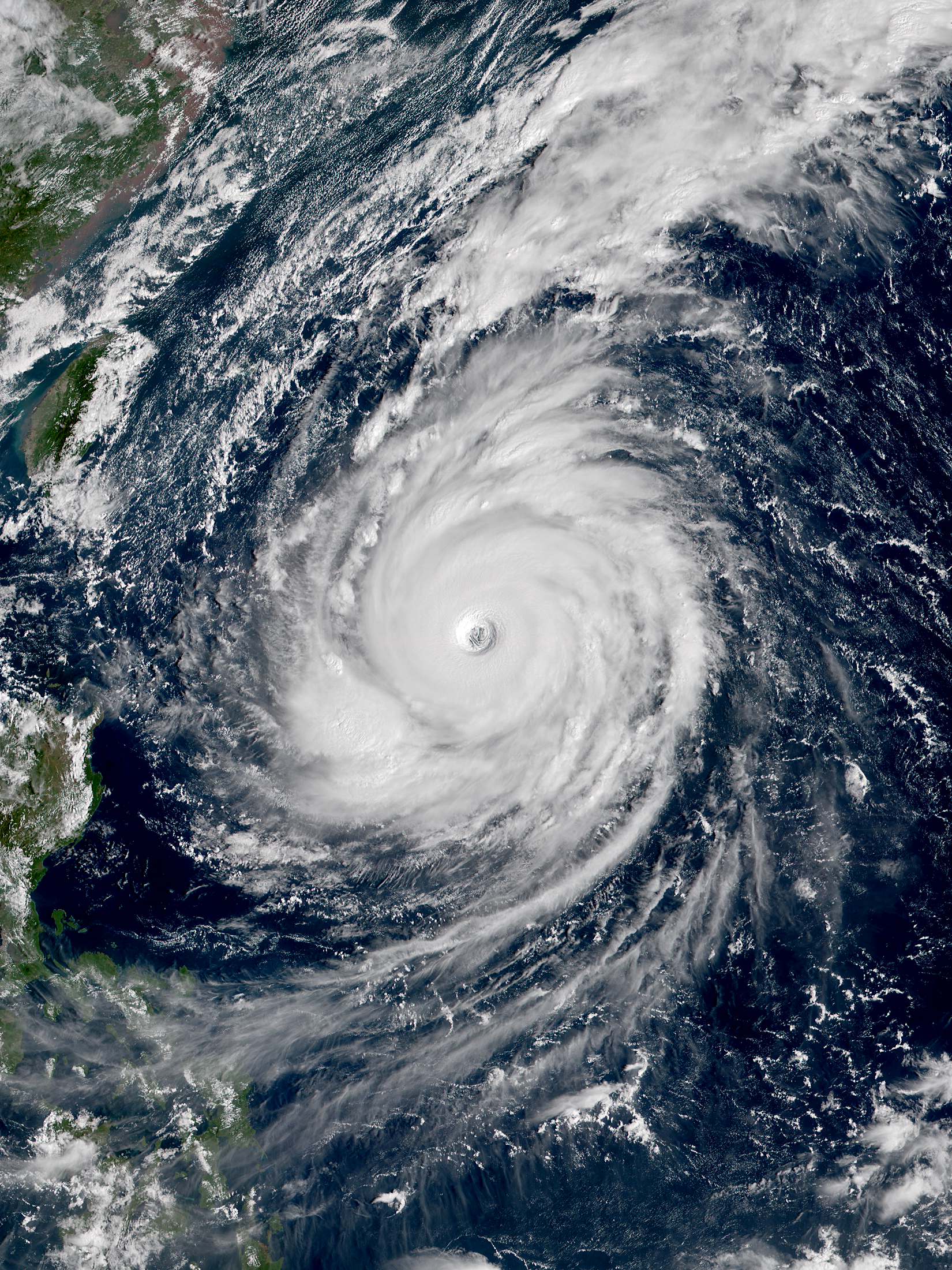
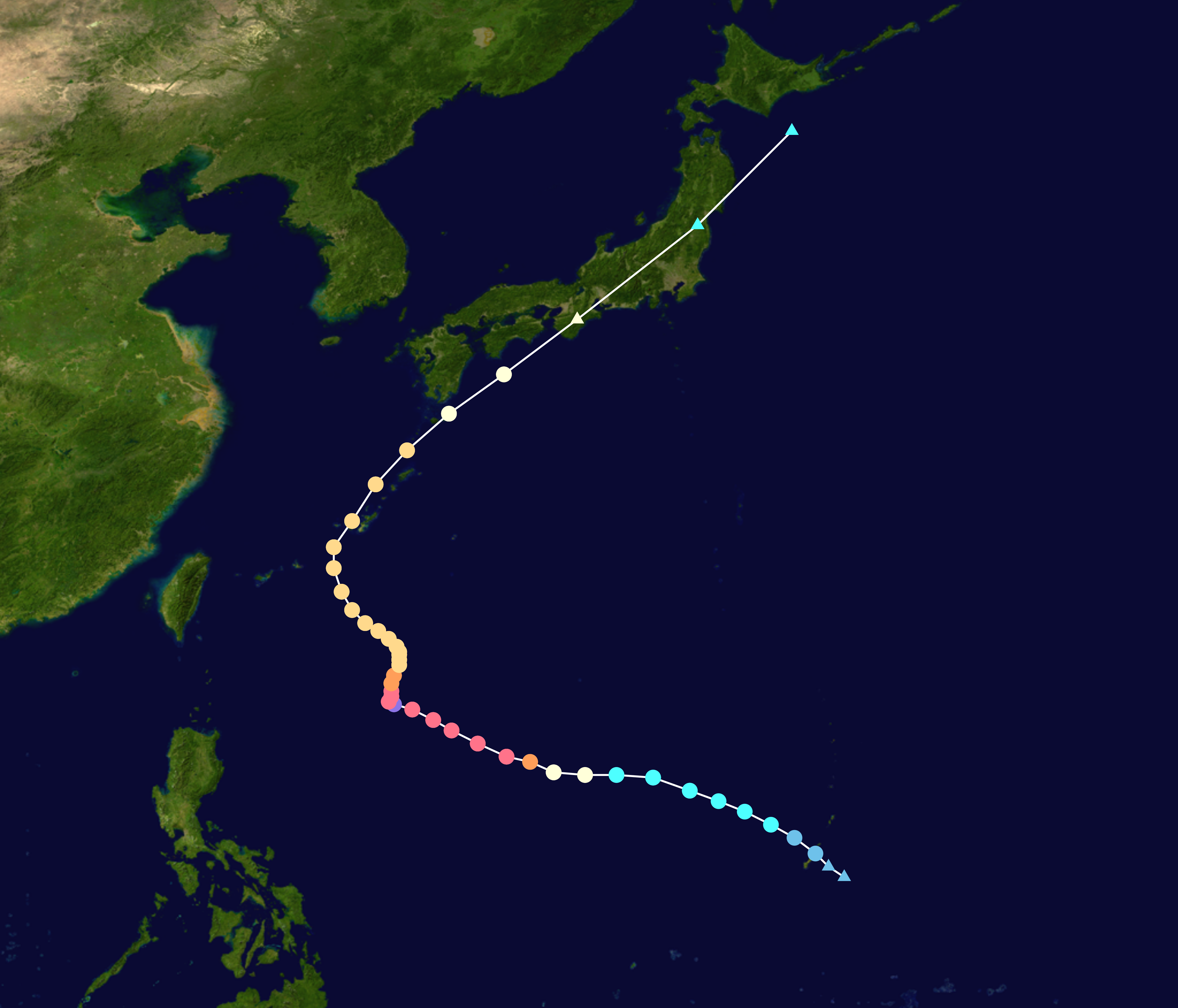
- Duration: September 20 – October 1
- Peak intensity: 195 km/h (120 mph) (10-min); 915 hPa (mbar)

On September 19, the NRL began to monitor a large tropical disturbance that formed near Chuuk in the Federated States of Micronesia. The system drifted westwards and strengthened into a tropical depression on September 20 according to the JMA, while the JTWC issued a TCFA. Trami managed to find itself in favorable conditions for strengthening and on September 21, it gained tropical storm status and was named Trami. On September 22, Trami still strengthened and became a Severe Tropical Storm before strengthening to a Category 1 typhoon. On September 23, Trami, yet again in favorable conditions, continued to strengthen and became a Category 3-equivalent typhoon while undergoing an eyewall replacement cycle at the same time. Early on September 24, Trami strengthened further and attained Category 4 super typhoon status once it finished its eyewall replacement cycle. At 18:00 UTC on September 24, Trami strengthened even further and subsequently became a Category 5 super typhoon. On its route to Okinawa, Japan, Trami slowed down considerably and was almost stationary before moving north-northeastward. During this period of time, another eyewall replacement cycle that eventually failed later on, coupled with decreasing sea surface temperatures, started to slowly weaken Trami, although it still remained an organized storm. On September 30, Trami reached the most organized point of its duration after its peak, but Trami's structure started to deteriorate afterward, and the storm's winds gradually dropped as Trami resumed weakening. The typhoon made landfall over Tanabe, Wakayama Prefecture at around 20:00 JST (11:00 UTC) on September 30 as a Category 2-equivalent typhoon. The storm's structure deteriorated rapidly after landfall, and the JMA issued their last advisory on Trami on October 1. After Trami impacted Honshu, it completely transitioned into a hurricane-force extratropical cyclone and impacted the Kuril Islands and weakened to a storm-force system. Its extratropical remnants were last tracked in the Bering Sea, near the Aleutian Islands.

Agricultural damage in Japan were at ¥61.65 billion (US$542 million).

=== Tropical Depression 29W ===
- Tropical depression (JMA)
- Tropical depression (SSHWS)
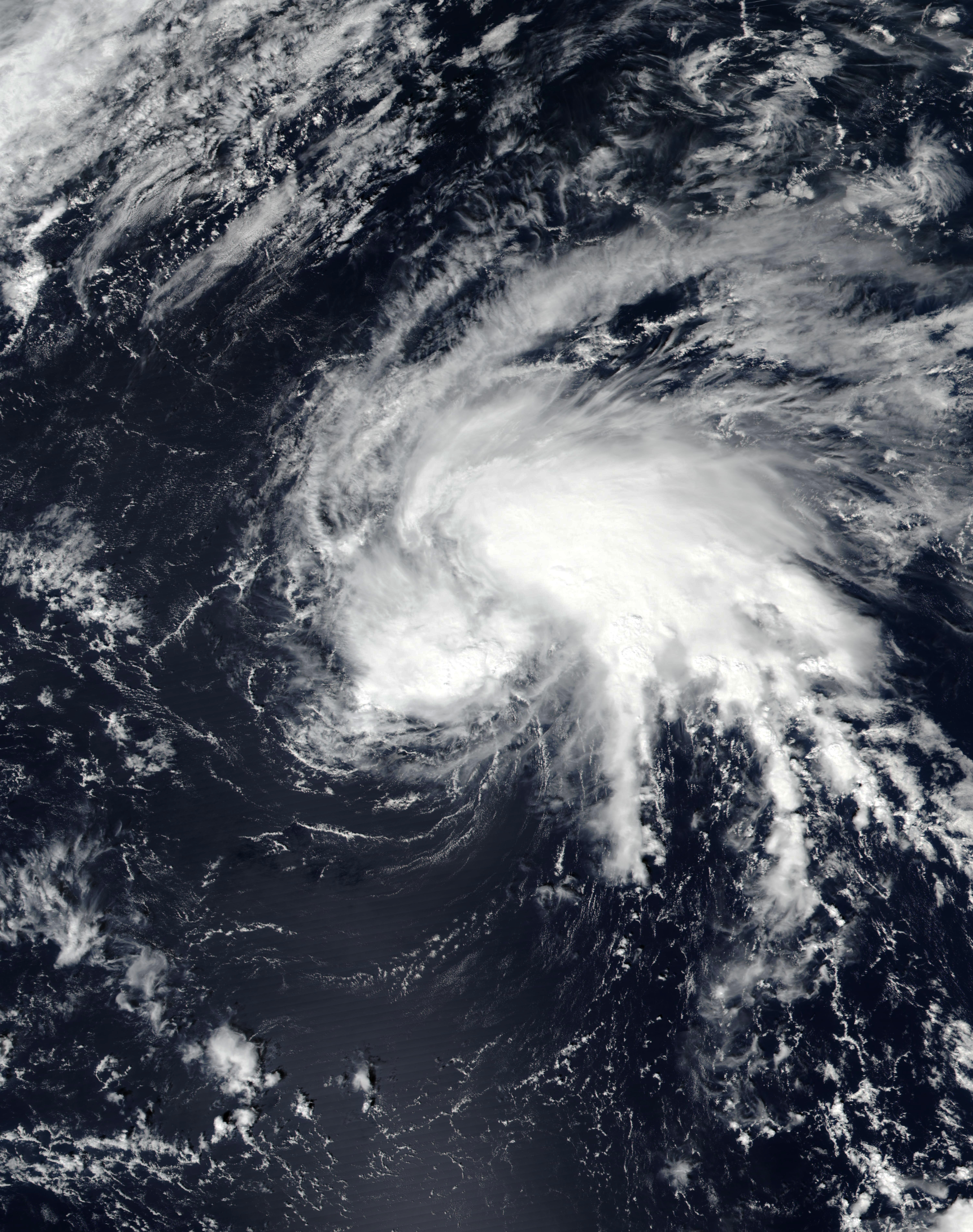
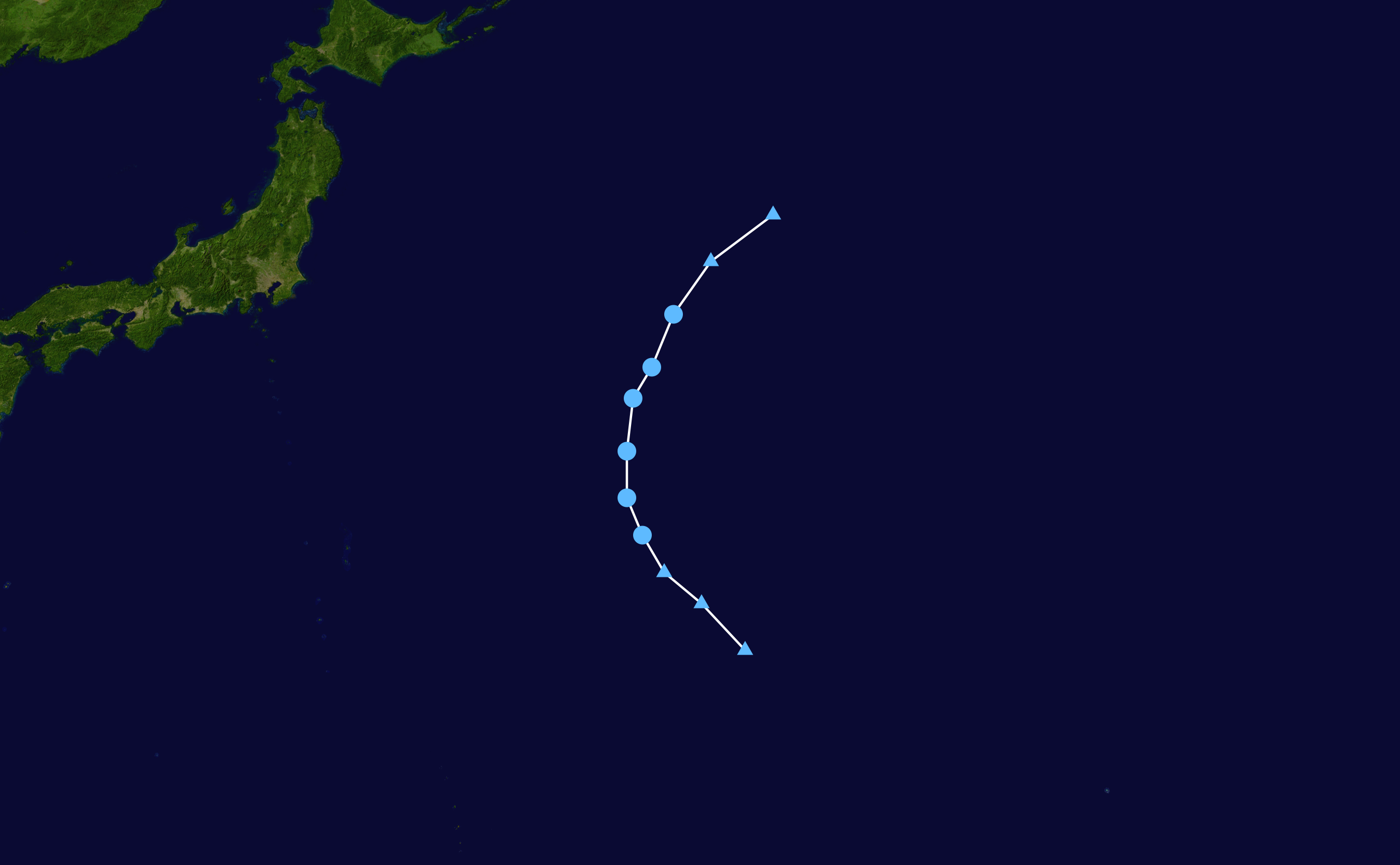
- Duration: September 25 – September 27
- Peak intensity: 55 km/h (35 mph) (10-min); 1008 hPa (mbar)

On September 25, a tropical depression formed from the remnant energy of Hurricane Olivia to the southeast of Japan. The JTWC gave the system the designation 29W on the next day. However, Tropical Depression 29W remained a weak system, and developed an exposed low-level circulation center later that day. Afterward, the tropical depression accelerated northward and then north-northeastward, until it was eventually absorbed into a developing extratropical cyclone east of Japan on September 27.

=== Typhoon Kong-rey (Queenie) ===
- Violent typhoon (JMA)
- Category 5 super typhoon (SSHWS)
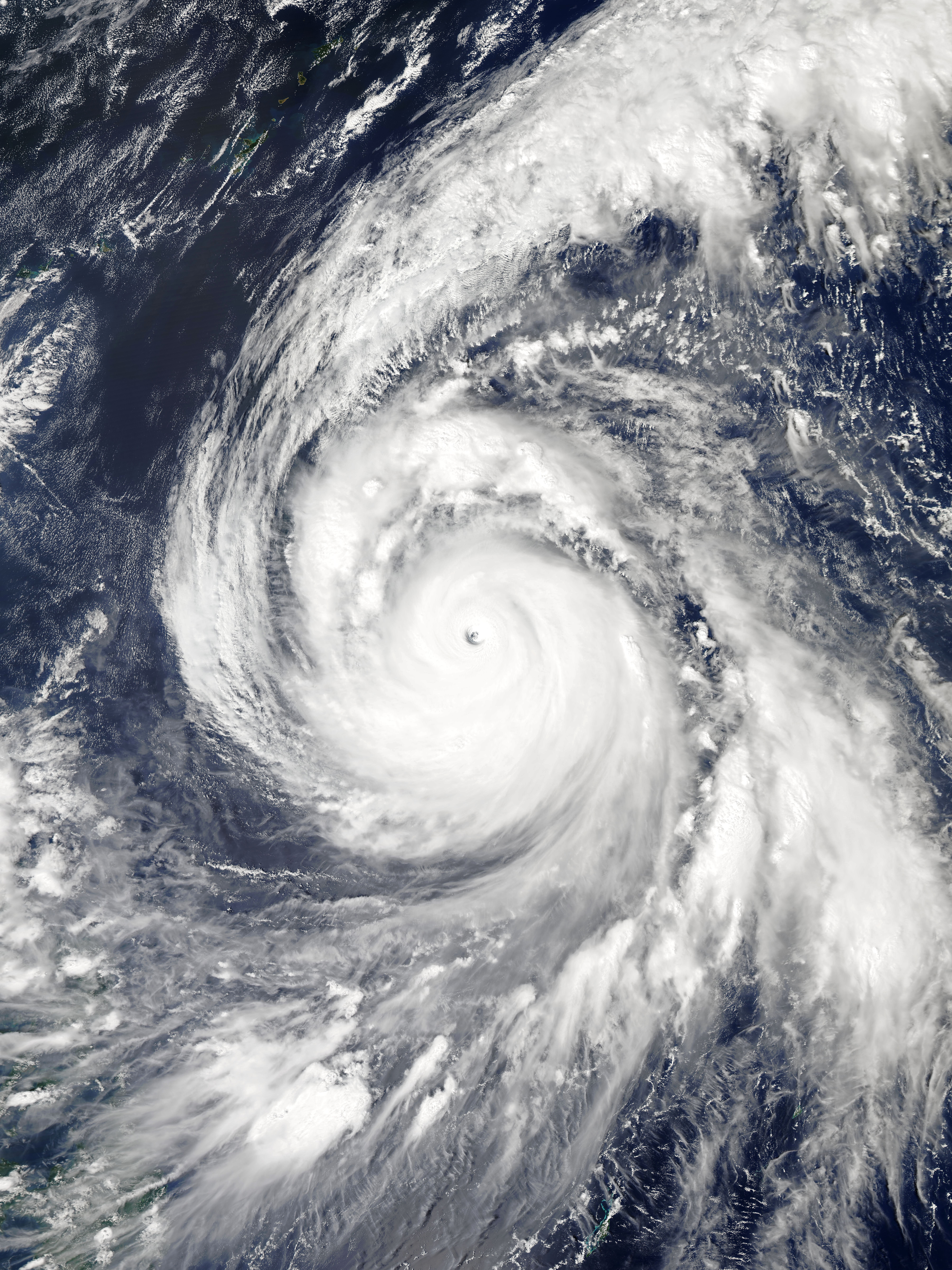
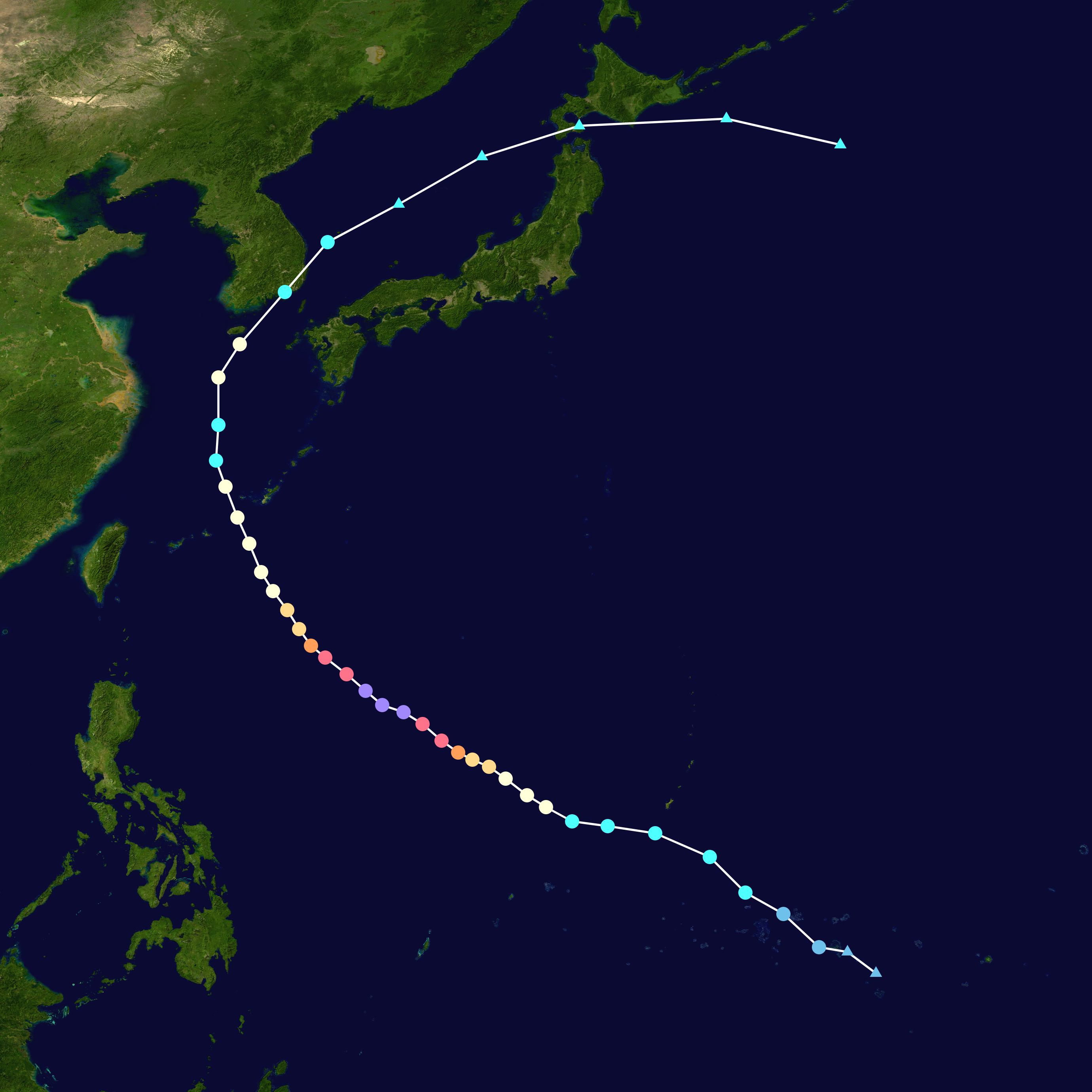
- Duration: September 28 – October 6
- Peak intensity: 215 km/h (130 mph) (10-min); 900 hPa (mbar)

In late September, a tropical disturbance formed in the waters near Pohnpei Island in the Federated States of Micronesia. The Joint Typhoon Warning Center also gave the storm, Invest 94W, a low chance of development. Over the next couple of days, the system moved westward and organized into a tropical depression on September 27, and the JMA initiated advisories on the storm, while the JTWC issued a TCFA. On September 28, the JTWC designated the system as 30W, while the JMA issued a gale warning for the system. As Tropical Depression 30W continued strengthening, the system became a tropical storm and was named Kong-rey by the JMA. On September 29, the system moved further west, found itself in favorable conditions for strengthening, and became a tropical storm. Later that day, Kong-rey strengthened into a severe tropical storm, and on September 30, the storm attained typhoon status at 03:00 UTC. Kong-rey continued strengthening, and at 18:00 UTC on October 1, Kong-rey became a Category 4-equivalent super typhoon. Early on October 2, Kong-rey strengthened into a Category 5 super typhoon. Affected by vertical wind shear, low ocean heat content and decreasing sea surface temperatures, the storm gradually weakened to a Category 3 typhoon on October 3 while undergoing an eyewall replacement cycle. Increased vertical wind shear and lower sea surface temperatures hampered Kong-rey's strength, and Kong-rey was downgraded to a tropical storm on October 4. Early on October 6, Kong-rey made landfall in Tongyeong, South Gyeongsang Province in South Korea as a high-end tropical storm, and later on the same day, Kong-rey transitioned into an extratropical cyclone, while impacting southern Hokkaido, such as areas near Hakodate.

As of October 2018, 3 people have been killed by the storm, including 2 people from South Korea. Damage nationwide totaled at ₩54.9 billion (US$48.5 million). Although Kong-Rey did not make a direct landfall on Kyushu and Shikoku, its outer rainbands affected the two islands. At an area in Shikoku, rain accumulated to 300 mm. In Nagasaki, more than 12,000 families lost power; in Fukuoka Prefecture, a person died because of the rain. Agricultural damage in Okinawa and Miyazaki Prefecture were about JP¥13.99 billion (US$123 million).

Unrelated to Kong-rey, Hurricane Walaka was a Category 5 hurricane at the same time Kong-rey intensified to Category 5 super typhoon intensity, marking the first time since 2005 when two tropical cyclones of Category 5 strength existed simultaneously in the Northern Hemisphere.

=== Typhoon Yutu (Rosita) ===
- Violent typhoon (JMA)
- Category 5 super typhoon (SSHWS)
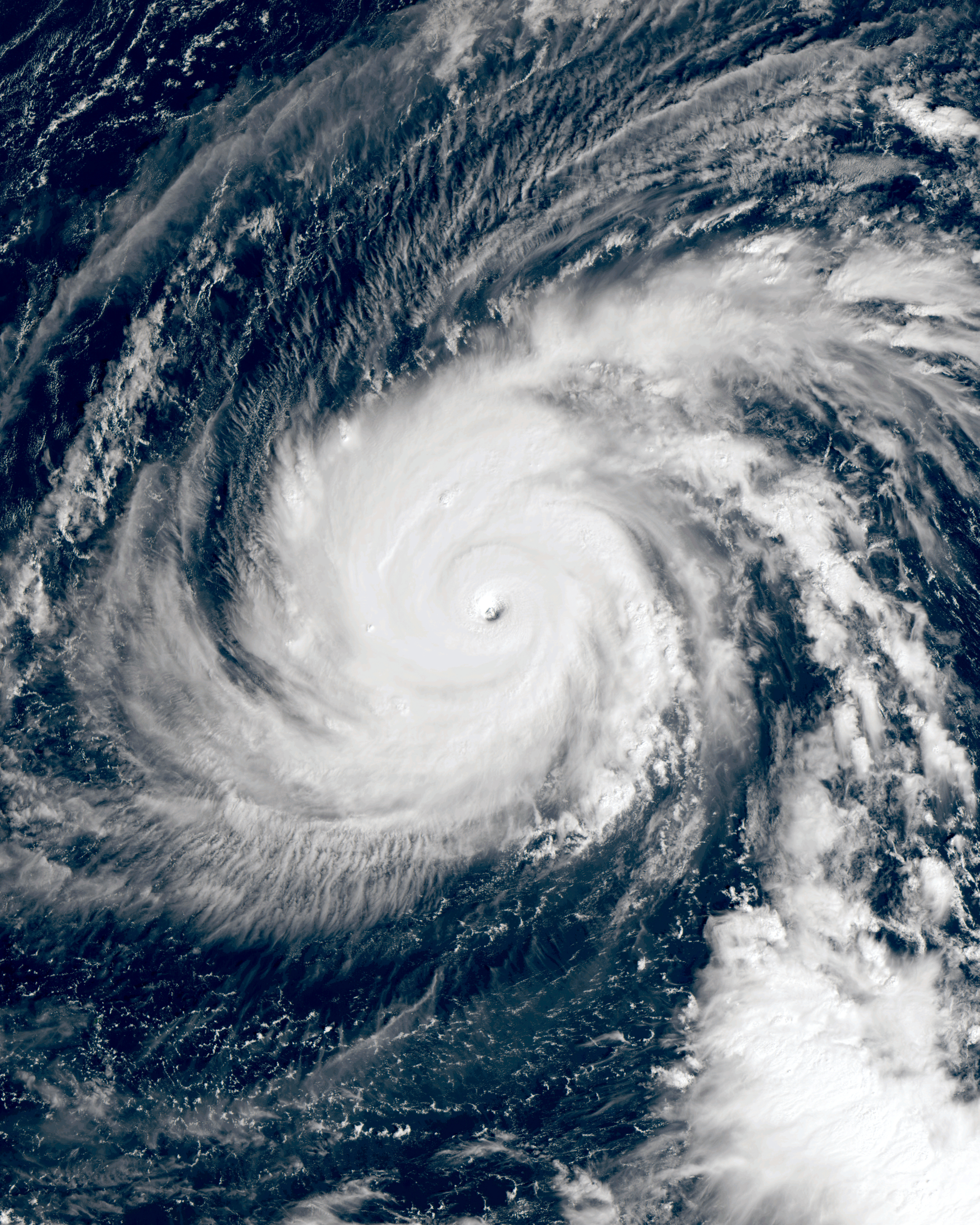
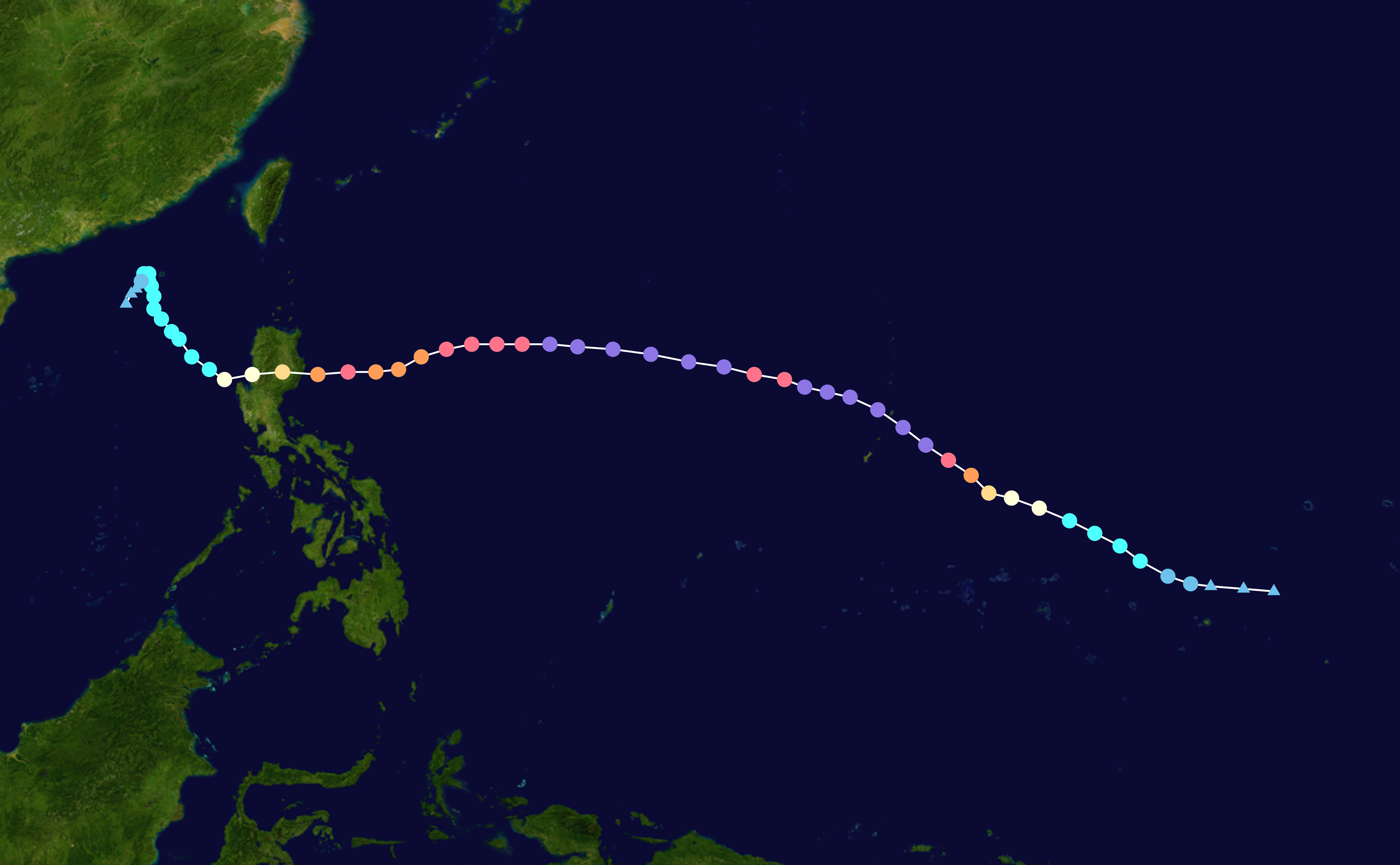
- Duration: October 21 – November 3
- Peak intensity: 215 km/h (130 mph) (10-min); 900 hPa (mbar)

Early on October 21, a tropical depression developed to the east of Guam and the Northern Mariana Islands, with the JMA initiating advisories on the system. Shortly afterward, the JTWC assigned the storm the identifier 31W. The system began to strengthen, becoming a tropical storm several hours later, and the JMA named the system Yutu. Favorable conditions, including low wind shear and high ocean-surface temperatures, allowed Yutu to explosively intensify on the following day, with the storm reaching severe tropical storm strength and then typhoon intensity a few hours later. From October 23 to 24, Yutu continued to organize and explosively intensify, reaching Category 5 super typhoon intensity on October 24. The typhoon continued to strengthen and displayed a healthy convective structure, while moving towards the island of Saipan. Later on the same day, Typhoon Yutu made landfall on the island of Tinian, just south of Saipan, at Category 5 intensity, with 1-minute sustained winds of 285 km/h (177 mph), becoming the most powerful storm on record to impact the northern Mariana Islands.

After making landfall on Tinian, Yutu underwent an eyewall replacement cycle, which it successfully completed on the next day, and the storm strengthened back to Category 5 super typhoon status on October 26, at 15:00 UTC.

On October 27, Yutu's eye became cloud-filled, indicative of weakening, and the storm weakened to a Category 4 super typhoon. On the same day, the storm entered PAGASA's area of responsibility, and Yutu was given the name Rosita by PAGASA. On October 28, Yutu quickly weakened, as the storm moved over ocean waters with significantly lower sea-surface heat content.

After making landfall on October 30, Yutu rapidly weakened, and when it emerged over the South China Sea, low ocean heat content and westerly wind shear caused Yutu to weaken below typhoon status. On November 2, Yutu weakened into a remnant low off the coast of China, before dissipating on the next day.

On October 25, in Saipan, the typhoon killed a woman when it destroyed the building she was staying in, and injured 133 other people, three of whom were severely injured. On Saipan and nearby Tinian, high winds from Yutu knocked down more than 200 power poles. Most of the buildings in southern Saipan lost their roofs or were destroyed, including a high school that was wrecked.

=== Severe Tropical Storm Usagi (Samuel) ===
- Severe tropical storm (JMA)
- Category 2 typhoon (SSHWS)
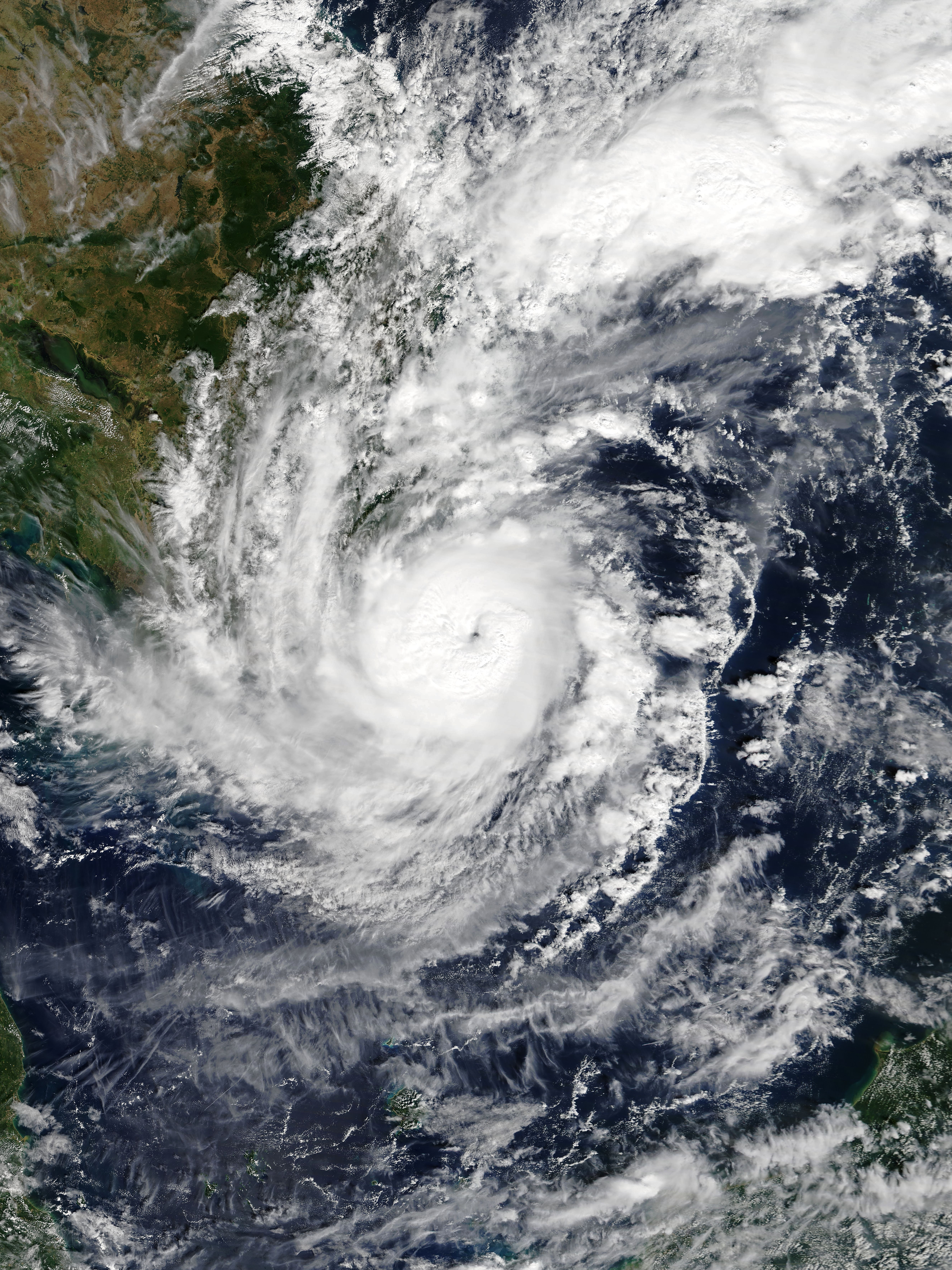
- Duration: November 14 – November 26
- Peak intensity: 110 km/h (70 mph) (10-min); 990 hPa (mbar)

On November 3, the Central Pacific Hurricane Center began monitoring a disturbance that had formed in the Central Pacific basin. This disturbance soon moved out of the basin and into the West Pacific without further development on November 6. Tracking westward, the system did not organize until late on November 18, when it reached tropical depression status on the Saffir-Simpson scale. The PAGASA named the system Tropical Depression "Samuel" and issued warnings for Mindanao and Visayas. Samuel made landfall on November 20 in the Philippines, crossing the archipelago and weakening slightly. Samuel began to restrengthen over the South China Sea, and was subsequently named "Usagi". Usagi underwent rapid intensification, and became a severe tropical storm on November 21 while moving slowly. By November 22, Usagi (Samuel) intensified into a Category 1 typhoon. On November 24, Usagi weakened back to a severe tropical storm while heading to Vietnam because of the land interaction.

Usagi caused one death in the Philippines, and the agricultural damage were at ₱52.2 million (US$994,000). On November 25, Usagi made landfall on Mekong Delta. The typhoon caused flooding in Ho Chi Minh City and killed three people. Losses in Vietnam were at ₫925 billion (US$39.5 million).

=== Tropical Storm Toraji ===
- Tropical storm (JMA)
- Tropical depression (SSHWS)
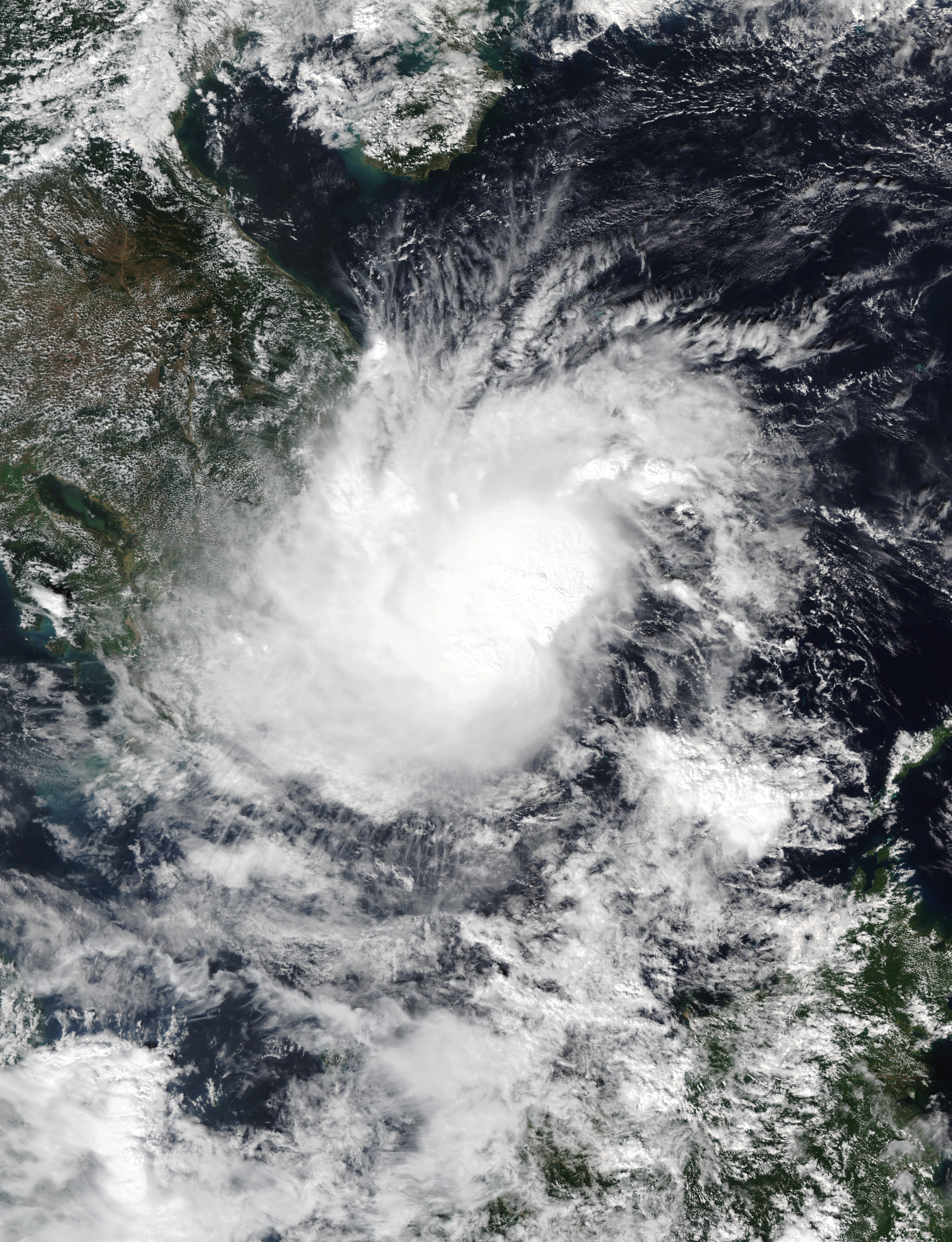
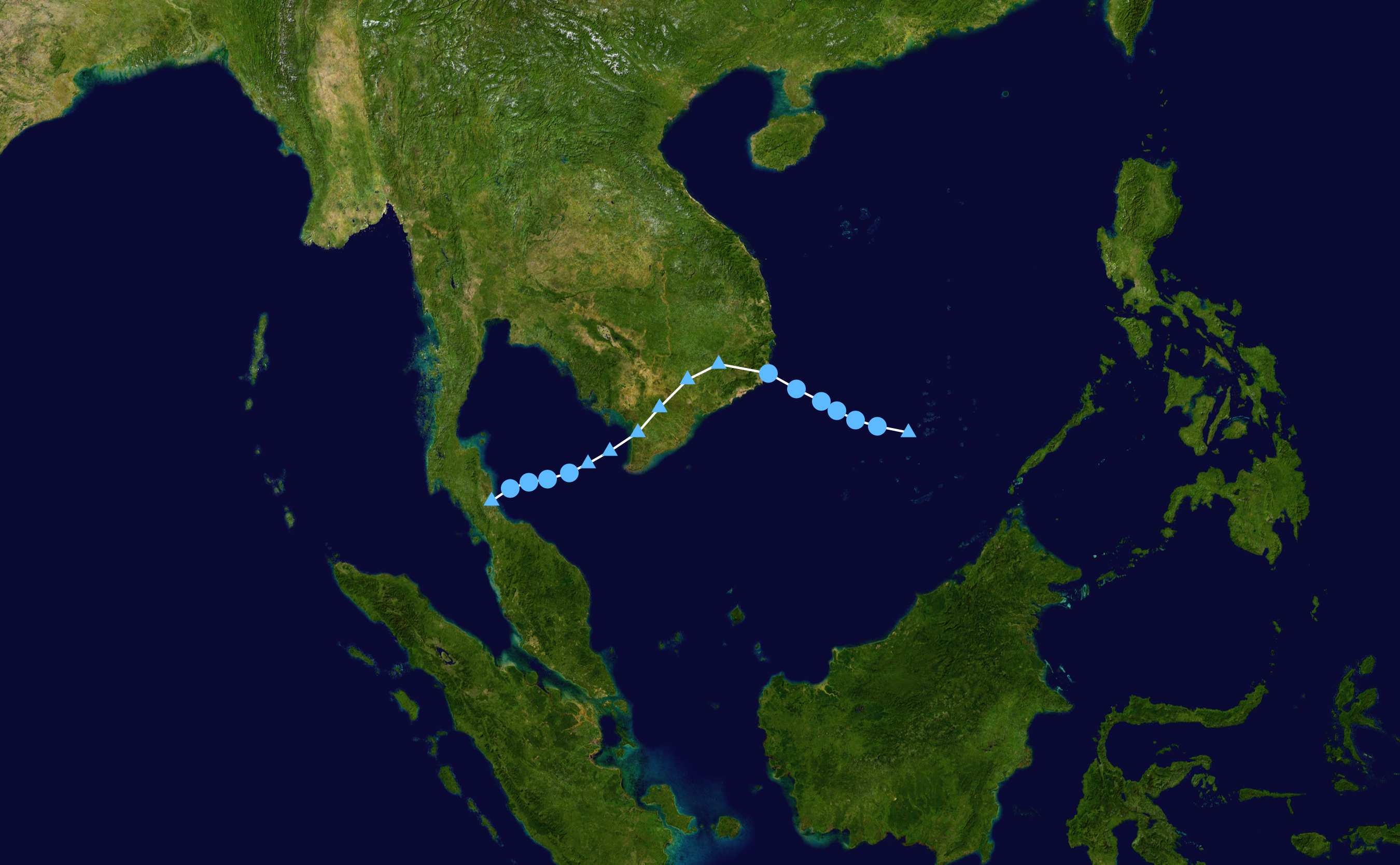
- Duration: November 16 – November 18
- Peak intensity: 65 km/h (40 mph) (10-min); 1004 hPa (mbar)

A low pressure system exited the PAR on November 15. Late on November 16, a tropical disturbance formed east of Vietnam. It slowly tracked west-northwest and strengthened into a tropical-depression strength storm early on November 17. Toraji made landfall on November 18 and quickly weakened; the remnants emerged into the Gulf of Thailand, and the remnants briefly reorganized, regaining tropical-depression strength on November 20. However, as Toraji made a second landfall on the Malay Peninsula, it weakened once more and dissipated late on November 21, due to wind shear over the Strait of Malacca.

Toraji caused flooding in Nha Trang, resulting in 20 dead and ₫1.24 trillion (US$53.6 million) in damages.

=== Typhoon Man-yi (Tomas) ===
- Typhoon (JMA)
- Category 2 typhoon (SSHWS)
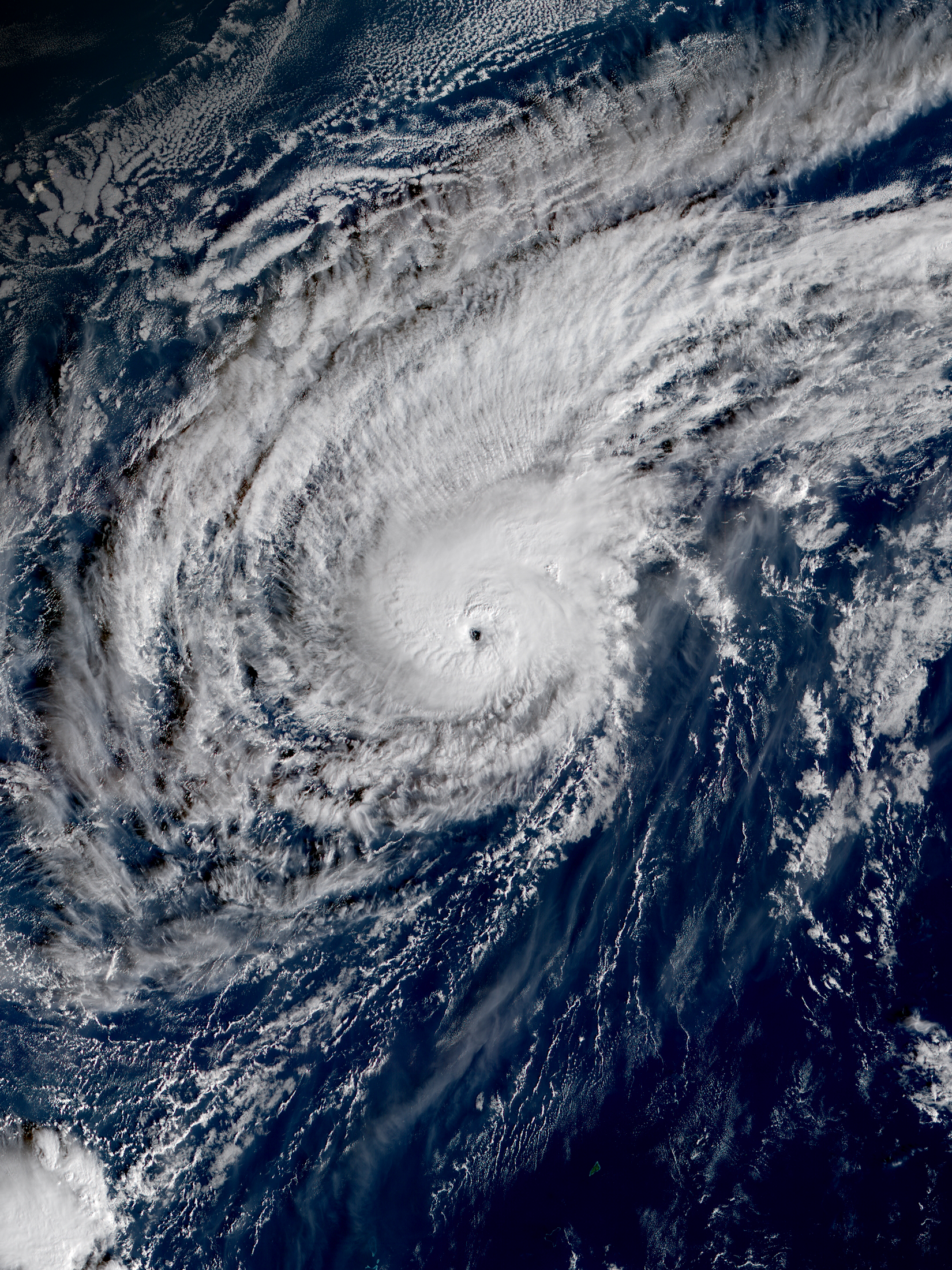
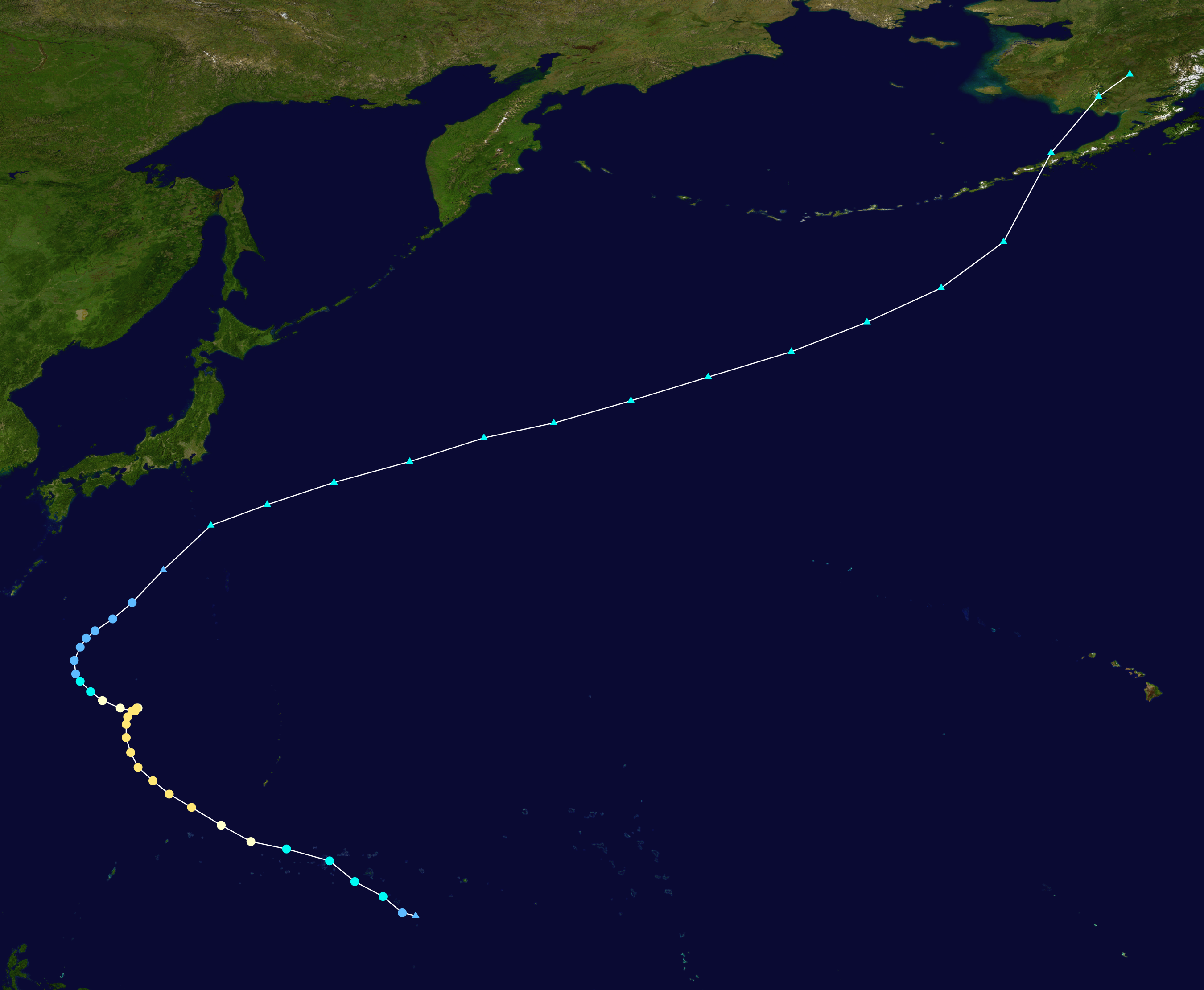
- Duration: November 20 – November 28
- Peak intensity: 150 km/h (90 mph) (10-min); 960 hPa (mbar)

On November 19, a tropical depression formed well east of the Philippines and intensified into a tropical storm soon thereafter, receiving the name Man-yi. After reaching typhoon status on November 21, Man-yi entered the Philippine basin and received the name Tomas from PAGASA. Shortly after, Man-yi intensified into a Category 2 typhoon. However, after completing an anticyclonic loop due to the influences of nearby weather systems, entering and exiting the PAR multiple times, Man-yi dipped to Category 1 status and moved into cooler waters. Succumbing to hostile conditions, Man-yi weakened into a tropical storm once more on November 25 and degenerated into a tropical depression by the end of the next day, while tracking northeast, and became an extratropical cyclone.

=== Tropical Depression 35W (Usman) ===
- Tropical depression (JMA)
- Tropical depression (SSHWS)
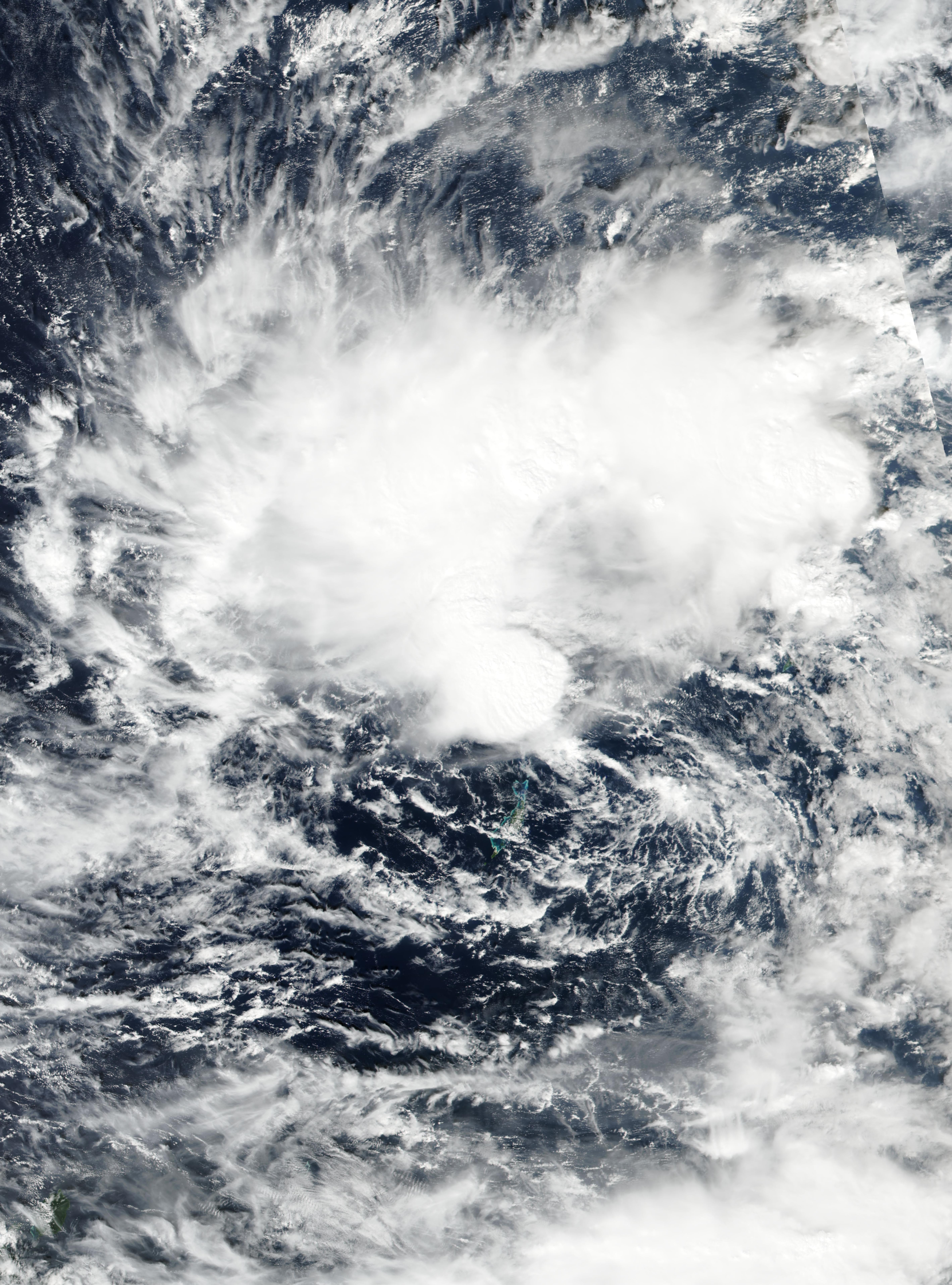
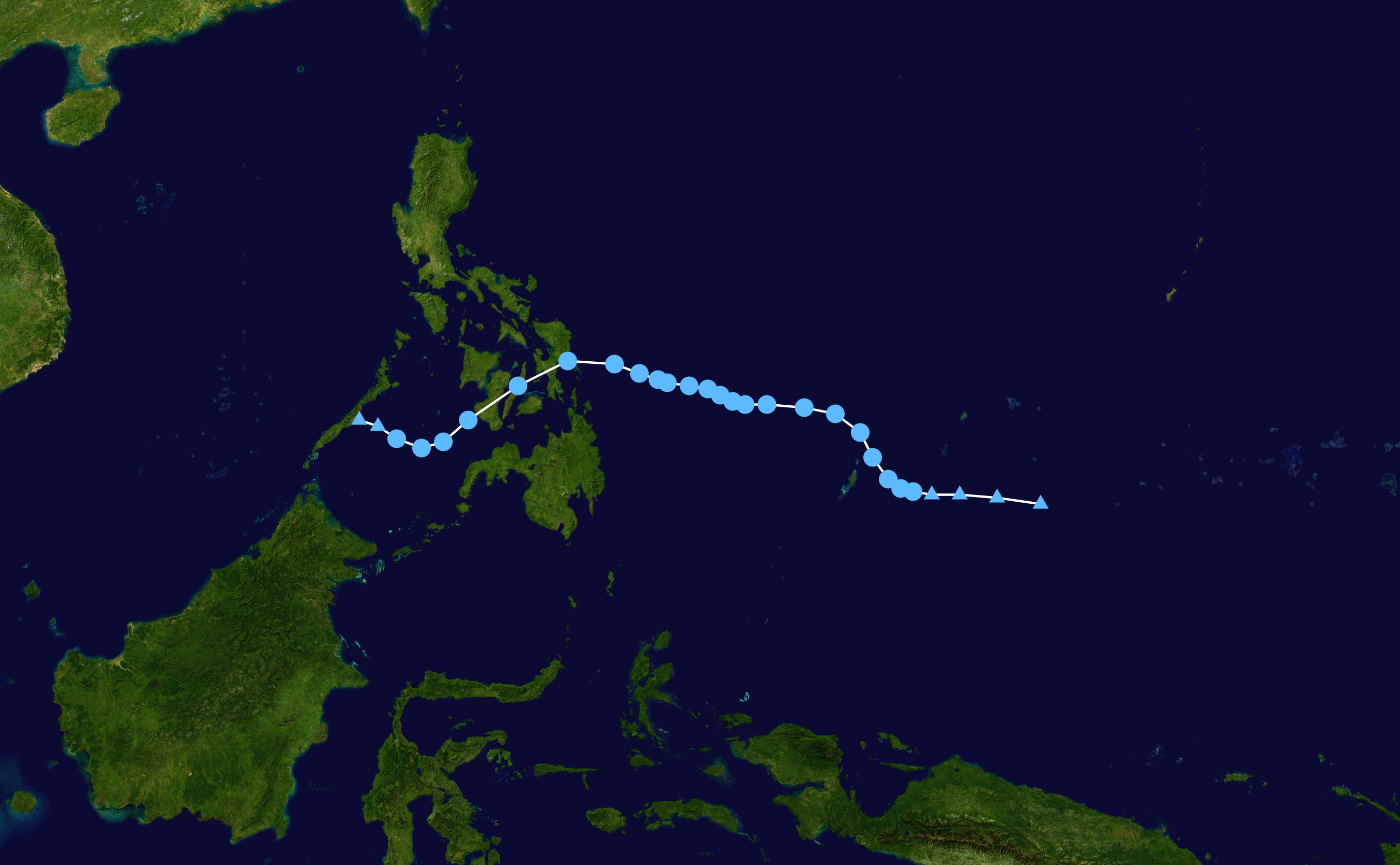
- Duration: December 25 – December 29
- Peak intensity: 55 km/h (35 mph) (10-min); 1000 hPa (mbar)

A tropical depression formed in the Philippine Sea on Christmas Day, December 25. It entered the PAR later that evening and the PAGASA named the significant tropical depression "Usman". Usman made its first landfall on Samar, Eastern Visayas on December 28. It passed over Palawan and other areas in the weekend. Usman did not survive the passage of the Philippines and degenerated into a remnant low. The remnants of 35W were absorbed by an invest on December 30 which would later become Tropical Storm Pabuk.

While passing over the Philippines, Usman brought heavy rains that caused several landslides, which killed 156 people, with damages amounting to Php5.41 billion (US$103 million).

=== Other systems ===
- On June 4, the JMA began tracking a weak tropical depression that had formed northeast of Yap. However, the system was absorbed by a nearby tropical depression, which would eventually become Severe Tropical Storm Maliksi on the next day.
- After Gaemi became extratropical, a tropical depression formed south of Hong Kong early on June 17, and dissipated over the east coast of Guangdong, China one day later.
- On July 16, a tropical depression developed over the South China Sea. The system remained weak and moved into Vietnam, before dissipating on the next day.
- On August 4, the JTWC began to track a subtropical storm that had developed just west of the International Date Line; the storm subsequently became extratropical on the next day.
- A tropical depression formed southeast of Okinawa on August 24; two days later, it made landfall over Shanghai and quickly dissipated over Jiangsu, in East China.
- The remnants of Hurricane Olivia entered the basin on September 19, and redeveloped into a tropical depression on September 21, while slowly drifting westward. Two days later, it degenerated into a remnant low again, as the JMA reported the system's dissipation. On September 25, the system's remnant energy developed into Tropical Depression 29W.
- On October 19, the JMA began tracking a tropical depression in the Gulf of Thailand. On October 20, the tropical depression made landfall on the Malay Peninsula and weakened into a remnant low, before moving out of the basin.
- A tropical depression formed over the southern portion of the South China Sea on December 31, with the JTWC designation 36W. The system intensified into Tropical Storm Pabuk on January 1, 2019, becoming the first named storm of the 2019 Pacific typhoon season.

== Storm names ==
Within the Northwest Pacific Ocean, both the Japan Meteorological Agency (JMA) and the Philippine Atmospheric, Geophysical and Astronomical Services Administration (PAGASA) assign names to tropical cyclones that develop in the Western Pacific, which can result in a tropical cyclone having two names. The Japan Meteorological Agency's RSMC Tokyo – Typhoon Center assigns international names to tropical cyclones on behalf of the World Meteorological Organization's Typhoon Committee, should they be judged to have 10-minute sustained windspeeds of 65 km/h (40 mph). PAGASA names tropical cyclones which move into or form as a tropical depression in their area of responsibility located between 135°E and 115°E and between 5°N and 25°N, even if the cyclone has had an international name assigned to it. The names of significant tropical cyclones are retired, by both PAGASA and the Typhoon Committee. Should the list of names for the Philippine region be exhausted then names will be taken from an auxiliary list of which the first ten are published each season. Unused names are marked in gray.

=== International names ===
During the season 29 tropical storms developed in the Western Pacific and 28 were named by the JMA, when the system was judged to have 10-minute sustained windspeeds of 65 km/h (40 mph). The JMA selected the names from a list of 140 names, that had been developed by the 14 members nations and territories of the ESCAP/WMO Typhoon Committee. During the season, the names Ampil, Jongdari and Barijat were used for the first time, after they replaced the names Bopha, Sonamu and Utor which were all retired after the 2012 and 2013 seasons respectively.

Bolaven	Sanba	Jelawat	Ewiniar	Maliksi	Gaemi	Prapiroon	Maria	Son-Tinh	Ampil	Wukong	Jongdari	Shanshan	Yagi
Leepi	Bebinca	Rumbia	Soulik	Cimaron	Jebi	Mangkhut	Barijat	Trami	Kong-rey	Yutu	Toraji	Man-yi	Usagi

- Additionally, Hector entered the Western Pacific basin from the Central Pacific basin after crossing the International Date Line (180°E) as a tropical cyclone. As the system crossed between basins intact, it retained the name assigned to it by the National Hurricane Center.

==== Retirement ====
After the season, at their 51st Session in 2019, the ESCAP/WMO Typhoon Committee announced that the names Rumbia, Mangkhut, and Yutu were removed from the naming lists due to the number of deaths and amount of damages each one caused in their respective onslaughts, and they will not be used again for another typhoon name. In 2020, they were replaced by Pulasan, Krathon, and Yinxing, respectively.

=== Philippines ===
Agaton	Basyang	Caloy	Domeng	Ester
Florita	Gardo	Henry	Inday	Josie
Karding	Luis	Maymay	Neneng	Ompong
Paeng	Queenie	Rosita	Samuel	Tomas
Usman	Venus (unused)	Waldo (unused)	Yayang (unused)	Zeny (unused)
Auxiliary list
Agila (unused)	Bagwis (unused)	Chito (unused)	Diego (unused)	Elena (unused)
Felino (unused)	Gunding (unused)	Harriet (unused)	Indang (unused)	Jessa (unused)

During the season PAGASA used its own naming scheme for the 21 tropical cyclones, that either developed within or moved into their self-defined area of responsibility. This is the same list used from the 2014 season, except for the names Gardo, Josie, Maymay, Rosita, and Samuel, which replaced Glenda, Jose, Mario, Ruby, and Seniang. All five names, as well as Usman, were used for the first (and only, in the cases of Rosita and Usman) time this year.

==== Retirement ====
After the season, the names Ompong, Rosita and Usman were retired, as they caused at least ₱1 billion in damages, and they will not be used again. They were replaced with Obet, Rosal and Umberto for the 2022 season.

== Season effects ==
This table summarizes all the systems that developed within or moved into the North Pacific Ocean, to the west of the International Date Line during 2018. The tables also provide an overview of a systems intensity, duration, land areas affected and any deaths or damages associated with the system.

Name	Dates	Peak intensity			Areas affected	Damage (USD)	Deaths	Ref(s).
Name	Dates	Category	Wind speed	Pressure	Areas affected	Damage (USD)	Deaths	Ref(s).
Bolaven (Agaton)	December 29, 2017 – January 4, 2018	Tropical storm	65 km/h (40 mph)	1,002 hPa (29.6 inHg)	Philippines, Vietnam	$10.5 million	4	
Sanba (Basyang)	February 8 – 16	Tropical storm	65 km/h (40 mph)	1,000 hPa (30 inHg)	Caroline Islands, Philippines	$3.19 million	15	
Jelawat (Caloy)	March 24 – April 1	Violent typhoon	195 km/h (121 mph)	915 hPa (27.0 inHg)	Caroline Islands, Mariana Islands	Unknown	2	
04W	May 10 – 15	Tropical depression	Not specified	1,008 hPa (29.8 inHg)	None	None	None	
Ewiniar	June 2 – 9	Tropical storm	75 km/h (47 mph)	998 hPa (29.5 inHg)	Vietnam, Philippines, South China, Taiwan, Ryukyu Islands	$784 million	14	
Maliksi (Domeng)	June 3 – 11	Severe tropical storm	110 km/h (68 mph)	970 hPa (29 inHg)	Ryukyu Islands, Philippines, Honshu	None	2	
TD	June 4 – 5	Tropical depression	Not specified	1,006 hPa (29.7 inHg)	Guam	None	None	
07W	June 13 – 15	Subtropical storm	65 km/h (40 mph)	993 hPa (29.3 inHg)	Taiwan, Ryukyu Islands	None	None	
Gaemi (Ester)	June 13 – 16	Tropical storm	85 km/h (53 mph)	990 hPa (29 inHg)	Taiwan, Ryukyu Islands	None	3	
TD	June 17 – 18	Tropical depression	Not specified	998 hPa (29.5 inHg)	South China	None	None	
Prapiroon (Florita)	June 28 – July 4	Strong typhoon	120 km/h (75 mph)	960 hPa (28 inHg)	Japan, Korean Peninsula	$10.1 million	4	
Maria (Gardo)	July 3 – 12	Violent typhoon	195 km/h (121 mph)	915 hPa (27.0 inHg)	Mariana Islands, Ryukyu Islands, Taiwan, East China	$637 million	2	
Son-Tinh (Henry)	July 16 – 24	Tropical storm	75 km/h (47 mph)	994 hPa (29.4 inHg)	Philippines, South China, Vietnam, Laos, Thailand, Myanmar	$323 million	173	
TD	July 16 – 17	Tropical depression	Not specified	998 hPa (29.5 inHg)	South China, Vietnam, Laos	$14.9 million	None	
Ampil (Inday)	July 17 – 24	Severe tropical storm	95 km/h (59 mph)	985 hPa (29.1 inHg)	Ryukyu Islands, China, Russian Far East	$246 million	1	
13W (Josie)	July 20 – 23	Tropical depression	55 km/h (34 mph)	996 hPa (29.4 inHg)	Philippines, Taiwan, Ryukyu Islands, East China	$87.4 million	16	
Wukong	July 22 – 26	Severe tropical storm	95 km/h (59 mph)	990 hPa (29 inHg)	None	None	None	
Jongdari	July 23 – August 4	Strong typhoon	140 km/h (87 mph)	960 hPa (28 inHg)	Japan, East China	$1.48 billion	None	
16W	July 31 – August 1	Tropical depression	55 km/h (34 mph)	1,002 hPa (29.6 inHg)	None	None	None	
Shanshan	August 2 – 10	Strong typhoon	130 km/h (81 mph)	970 hPa (29 inHg)	Mariana Islands, Japan	$866,000	None	
Yagi (Karding)	August 6 – 15	Tropical storm	75 km/h (47 mph)	990 hPa (29 inHg)	Philippines, Taiwan, Ryukyu Islands, China	$379 million	7	
Bebinca	August 9 – 17	Tropical storm	85 km/h (53 mph)	985 hPa (29.1 inHg)	South China, Vietnam, Laos, Thailand, Myanmar	$391 million	19	
Leepi	August 10 – 15	Severe tropical storm	95 km/h (59 mph)	994 hPa (29.4 inHg)	Japan, South Korea	None	None	
Hector	August 13 – 16	Tropical storm	75 km/h (47 mph)	998 hPa (29.5 inHg)	None	None	None	
Rumbia	August 14 – 19	Tropical storm	85 km/h (53 mph)	985 hPa (29.1 inHg)	Ryukyu Islands, China, Korean Peninsula, Russian Far East	$5.36 billion	53	
Soulik	August 15 – 24	Very strong typhoon	155 km/h (96 mph)	950 hPa (28 inHg)	Caroline Islands, Mariana Islands, Northeast China, Japan, Korean Peninsula, Russian Far East, Alaska	$125 million	86	
Cimaron	August 16 – 24	Very strong typhoon	155 km/h (96 mph)	950 hPa (28 inHg)	Marshall Islands, Mariana Islands, Japan, Aleutian Islands	$30.6 million	3	
24W (Luis)	August 21 – 26	Tropical depression	55 km/h (34 mph)	994 hPa (29.4 inHg)	Taiwan, East China	$34 million	7	
TD	August 24 – 26	Tropical depression	Not specified	1,002 hPa (29.6 inHg)	Ryukyu Islands, East China	None	None	
Jebi (Maymay)	August 26 – September 4	Violent typhoon	195 km/h (121 mph)	915 hPa (27.0 inHg)	Mariana Islands, Taiwan, Japan, Russian Far East, Arctic	$13 billion	21	
TD	September 5 – 8	Tropical depression	55 km/h (34 mph)	1,004 hPa (29.6 inHg)	Ryukyu Islands	None	None	
Mangkhut (Ompong)	September 6 – 17	Violent typhoon	205 km/h (127 mph)	905 hPa (26.7 inHg)	Marshall Islands, Mariana Islands, Taiwan, Philippines, Hong Kong, Macau, South China, Vietnam	$3.77 billion	134	
Barijat (Neneng)	September 8 – 13	Tropical storm	75 km/h (47 mph)	998 hPa (29.5 inHg)	Philippines, Taiwan, South China, Vietnam	$7.3 million	None	
Trami (Paeng)	September 20 – October 1	Violent typhoon	195 km/h (121 mph)	915 hPa (27.0 inHg)	Mariana Islands, Taiwan, Japan, Russian Far East, Alaska	$2.69 billion	4	
TD	September 21 – 22	Tropical depression	Not specified	1,006 hPa (29.7 inHg)	None	None	None	
29W	September 25 – 27	Tropical depression	55 km/h (34 mph)	1,008 hPa (29.8 inHg)	None	None	None	
Kong-rey (Queenie)	September 28 – October 6	Violent typhoon	215 km/h (134 mph)	900 hPa (27 inHg)	Caroline Islands, Mariana Islands, Japan, Taiwan, Korean Peninsula, Alaska	$172 million	3	
TD	October 19 – 20	Tropical depression	Not specified	1,008 hPa (29.8 inHg)	Vietnam, Cambodia, Thailand, Myanmar	None	None	
Yutu (Rosita)	October 21 – November 2	Violent typhoon	215 km/h (134 mph)	900 hPa (27 inHg)	Caroline Islands, Mariana Islands, Philippines, South China, Taiwan	$856 million	30	
Usagi (Samuel)	November 14 – 26	Severe tropical storm	110 km/h (68 mph)	990 hPa (29 inHg)	Caroline Islands, Philippines, Vietnam, Cambodia, Laos	$40.5 million	4	
Toraji	November 16 – 18	Tropical storm	65 km/h (40 mph)	1,004 hPa (29.6 inHg)	Vietnam, Thailand, Malaysia	$53.9 million	32	
Man-yi (Tomas)	November 20 – 28	Strong typhoon	150 km/h (93 mph)	960 hPa (28 inHg)	Caroline Islands, Alaska	None	None	
35W (Usman)	December 25 – 29	Tropical depression	55 km/h (34 mph)	1,000 hPa (30 inHg)	Palau, Philippines	$103 million	156	
Season aggregates
43 systems	December 29, 2017 – December 29, 2018		215 km/h (134 mph)	900 hPa (27 inHg)		$30.6 billion	793	

== See also ==
- Weather of 2018
- Tropical cyclones in 2018
- Pacific typhoon season
- 2018 Atlantic hurricane season
- 2018 Pacific hurricane season
- 2018 North Indian Ocean cyclone season
- South-West Indian Ocean cyclone seasons: 2017–18, 2018–19
- Australian region cyclone seasons: 2017–18, 2018–19
- South Pacific cyclone seasons: 2017–18, 2018–19
