= 2018 hurricane season =

2018 hurricane season may refer to any of the following tropical cyclone seasons

- 2018 Atlantic hurricane season
- 2018 Pacific hurricane season
- 2018 Pacific typhoon season
- 2018 North Indian Ocean cyclone season
- 2017–18 South-West Indian Ocean cyclone season
- 2018–19 South-West Indian Ocean cyclone season
- 2017–18 Australian region cyclone season
- 2018–19 Australian region cyclone season
- 2017–18 South Pacific cyclone season
- 2018–19 South Pacific cyclone season
