= National Highway 163 (India) =

National highway in India

National Highway 163
- Map of the National Highway 163 in red

Route information
- Length: 474 km (295 mi)

Major junctions
- From: Kodangal(Ravulapally), Telangana Via Hyderabad, Bhuvanagiri Warangal
- National Highway 44 in Hyderabad; National Highway 65 in Hyderabad; Outer Ring Road, Hyderabad at Ghatkesar; NH161AA at Bhuvanagiri; NH365B at Jangaon; National Highway 563 at Warangal; National Highway 63 at Bhopalpatnam
- To: Bhopalpatnam, Chhattisgarh

Location
- Country: India
- States: Telangana: 438 km Chhattisgarh: 36 km
- Primary destinations: -Kodangal(Ravulapally) -Pargi -Manneguda -Chevella -Chilkur -Himayatsagar ORR West -Hyderabad(Mehdipatnam -MGBS-Uppal) -Ghatkesar ORR East -Bhuvanagiri -Aler -Jangaon -Warangal -Mulugu -Eturunagaram -Venkatapuram -Bhopalpatnam

Highway system
- Roads in India; Expressways; National; State; Asian
| ← NH 162 | → NH 164 |

National Highway 163 (previously NH 202) is a National Highway in India that links Kodangal(Ravulapally) in Telangana and Bhopalpatnam road in Chhattisgarh Via major cities like Hyderabad, Uppal, Ghatkesar, Bhuvanagiri, Jangaon, Kazipet, Hanamkonda, Warangal. It was renumbered as NH 163. Currently there was a proposal for extension of NH 163 Pre-starting point (i.e., Kodangal Karnataka border) to Hyderabad.

It is a branch of NH 63 which connects Maharashtra to Odisha

== Route ==
Many cities and towns in various districts in the States of Telangana and Chhattisgarh are connected by National Highway 163. NH 163 has a total length of 474 km (295 mi) and passes through the states of Telangana and Chhattisgarh.

Route length in states:

- Telangana: 438 km (272 mi)
- Chhattisgarh: 36 km (22 mi)

== Connecting ==
| Name | Relation | Status | Length | route | Remarks |
|---|---|---|---|---|---|
| NH163 | 3249370 | | 474 km | NH 63 near Bhopalpatnam, Venkatapuram, NH 563 Warangal, NH 365B Jangaon, NH 161AA Bhuvanagiri, NH 65 Hyderabad | |
