= List of highways numbered 562 =

The following highways are numbered 562:

== Canada ==
- Alberta Highway 562
- Ontario Highway 562

== United Kingdom ==
- A562 road

== United States ==
- SR 562
- MD 562
- SR 562
- SR 562
- PA 562
- PR-562

| Preceded by 561 | Lists of highways 562 | Succeeded by 563 |
