= List of highways numbered 560 =

The following highways are numbered 560:

== Canada ==
- Alberta Highway 560 (Glenmore Trail)
- Ontario Highway 560
- Ontario Highway 560A

== Ireland ==
- R560 road (Ireland)

== South Africa ==
- R560 (South Africa)

== United Kingdom ==
- A560 road

== United States ==
- U.S. Route 560 (former proposal)
- Florida State Road 560 (pre-1945) (former)
- Hawaii Route 560
- Kentucky Route 560
- Louisiana Highway 560
  - Louisiana Highway 560-1 (former)
  - Louisiana Highway 560-2
  - Louisiana Highway 560-3 (former)
  - Louisiana Highway 560-4
- Maryland Route 560
- County Route 560 (New Jersey)
- County Route 560 (Erie County, New York)
- Ohio State Route 560
- Puerto Rico Highway 560
- South Carolina Highway 560
- Texas State Highway Loop 560 (former)
  - Farm to Market Road 560

| Preceded by 559 | Lists of highways 560 | Succeeded by 561 |
