= List of highways numbered 561 =

The following highways are numbered 561:

== Canada ==
- Highway 561

== India ==
- National Highway 561 (India)

== United States ==
- MD 561
- NC 561
- CR 561
- SR 561
- PR-561

Preceded by 560	Lists of highways 561	Succeeded by 562
