= List of highways numbered 565 =

The following highways are numbered 565:

== Canada ==
- Alberta Highway 565 (former)
- New Brunswick Route 565
- Ontario Highway 565

== India ==
- National Highway 565 (India)

== United Kingdom ==
- A565 road

== United States ==
- I-565
- SR 565
- MD 565
- CR 565
- SR 565
- PR-565

Preceded by 564	Lists of highways 565	Succeeded by 566
