= National Highway 161AA (India) =

National highway in India

National Highway 161AA
- Map of National Highway 161AA in red

Route information
- Auxiliary route of NH 61
- Length: 157.5 km (97.9 mi)

Major junctions
- West end: Sangareddy
- East end: Choutuppal

Location
- Country: India
- States: Telangana

Highway system
- Roads in India; Expressways; National; State; Asian
| ← NH 161 | → NH 65 |

National Highway 161AA, commonly called NH 161AA is a national highway in India. It is a spur road of National Highway 61 through NH 161. NH-161AA traverses the state of Telangana in India.

== Route ==
Sangareddy, Narsapur, Toopran, Gajwel, Pragnapur, Jagdevpur, Bhuvanagiri, Choutuppal.

== Junctions ==
NH 161 Terminal near Sangareddy.
NH 163 Terminal near Bhuvanagiri.
NH 65 Terminal near Choutuppal.

== See also ==
- List of national highways in India
- List of national highways in India by state
