= Bhopalpatnam =

- village
- Location in Chhattisgarh, India Bhopalpatnam (India)
- Coordinates: 18°51′50″N 80°23′0″E
- Country: India
- State: Chhattisgarh
- District: Bijapur

Population
  - Total: 4,445

Languages
  - Official: Chhattisgarhi
  - Majority: Telugu
- Time zone: UTC+5:30 (IST)
- Vehicle registration: CG

Bhopalpatnam is a tehsil, revenue division and development block in Bijapur district, Chhattisgarh, India. There lies a newly built bridge on indravati river connecting Chhattisgarh State to Maharashtra. NH-63 connects Jagdalpur- Sironcha-Chennuru, Telangana-Nizamabad, Telangana. The National Highway 163 begins here and connects to Warangal, Hyderabad in Telangana. There are 30 village panchayats in Bhopalpatnam.

Bhopalpatnam town lies 47 km west of the district headquarters in Bijapur.

== History ==
Bhopalpatnam struggle took place in 1795. It was one of the major revolts in Chhattisgarh during British period. This struggle was started as process to stop Captain Blunt from entering into Southern Bastar (mainly Bhopalpattnam) by the Gond tribals. Captain Blunt was the first English traveller in Bastar. He wandered for 17 days for entering into the capital. He was unsuccessful in travelling Bastar, but successful in travelling Kanker. Therefore, he had to return to Calcutta.
