= List of highways numbered 564 =

The following highways are numbered 564:

== Canada ==
- Alberta Highway 564
- Manitoba Provincial Road 564
- Ontario Highway 564

== Ireland ==
- R564 regional road

== United States ==
- I-564
- SR 564
- KY 564
- MD 564
- SR 564
- SR 564
- PR-564

Preceded by 563	Lists of highways 564	Succeeded by 565
