= 2018 North Indian Ocean cyclone season =

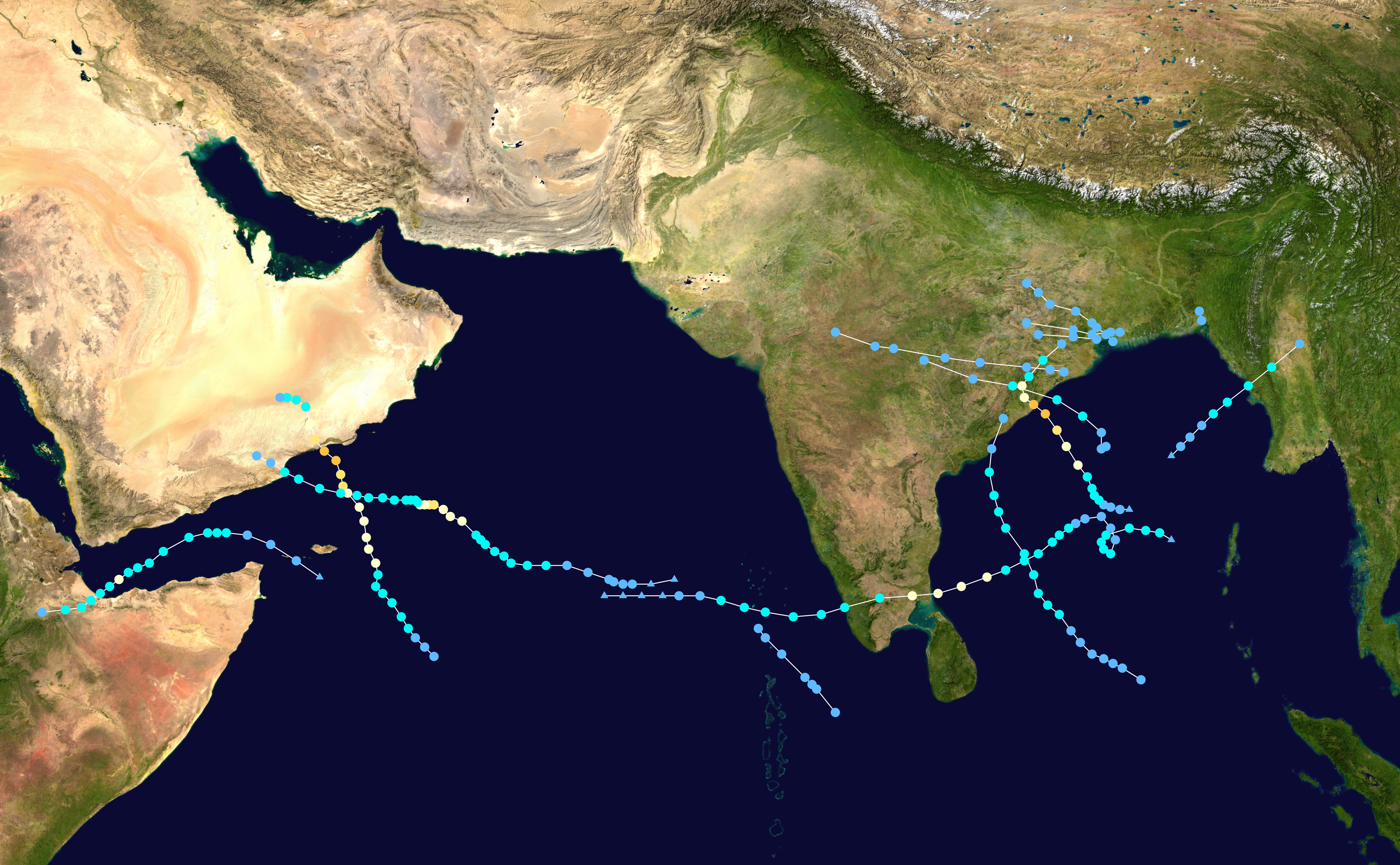
- Season summary map

Seasonal boundaries
- First system formed: March 13, 2018
- Last system dissipated: December 17, 2018

Strongest storm
- Name: Mekunu
  - Maximum winds: 175 km/h (110 mph) (3-minute sustained)
  - Lowest pressure: 960 hPa (mbar)

Seasonal statistics
- Depressions: 14
- Deep depressions: 10
- Cyclonic storms: 7
- Severe cyclonic storms: 5
- Very severe cyclonic storms: 4
- Extremely severe cyclonic storms: 1
- Total fatalities: 283 total
- Total damage: $4.32 billion (2018 USD)

Related articles
- 2018 Atlantic hurricane season; 2018 Pacific hurricane season; 2018 Pacific typhoon season

The 2018 North Indian Ocean cyclone season was one of the most active North Indian Ocean cyclone seasons since 1992, with the formation of fourteen depressions and seven cyclones. The North Indian Ocean cyclone season has no official bounds, but cyclones tend to form between April and December, with the two peaks in May and November. These dates conventionally delimit the period of each year when most tropical cyclones form in the northern Indian Ocean.

The scope of this article is limited to the Indian Ocean in the Northern Hemisphere, east of the Horn of Africa and west of the Malay Peninsula. There are two main seas in the North Indian Ocean — the Arabian Sea to the west of the Indian subcontinent, abbreviated ARB by the India Meteorological Department (IMD); and the Bay of Bengal to the east, abbreviated BOB by the IMD. The systems that form over land are abbreviated as LAND.

The official Regional Specialized Meteorological Centre in this basin is the IMD, while the Joint Typhoon Warning Center (JTWC) and the National Meteorological Center of CMA (NMC) unofficially release full advisories. On average, three to four cyclonic storms form in this basin every season.

== Season summary ==
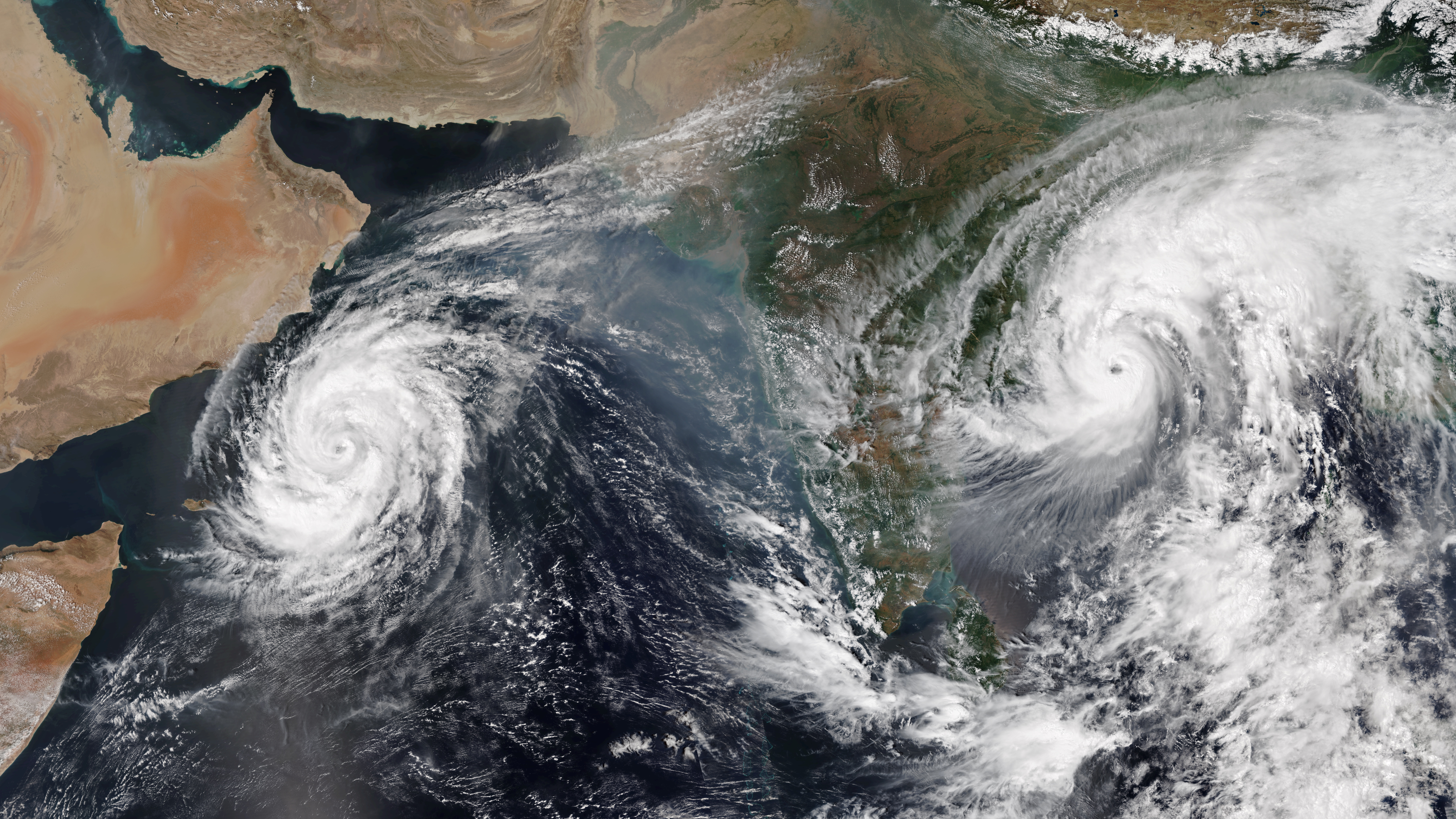
Very Severe Cyclonic Storms Luban (left) and Titli (right) over the Arabian Sea and the Bay of Bengal, respectively, on 10 October 2018. This was the first time that two simultaneous cyclones were active in the Bay of Bengal and the Arabian Sea since reliable records began in 1960.

The season started with ARB 01 which was formed on March 14 making one of the rarest system formed in March since tropical cyclone development stays relatively low between January and March. It caused heavy rainfall in Maldives, Lakshadweep and Kerala. After a two-month gap, another low formed near the Horn of Africa, which later became Sagar. It became unofficially the strongest cyclone to make landfall until it was broken by Gati in 2020. It caused heavy rainfall in Somaliland and local flooding was reported in the Yemeni coast. The storm made the westernmost landfall surpassing the record of Tropical Storm One. A day after Sagar dissipation, another low pressure formed off the coast of Oman which later organised into Cyclone Mekunu. It then peaked as a Category 3 tropical cyclone according to JTWC and an Extremely Severe Cyclonic Storm according to IMD. It caused 30 people dead and heavy rainfall recorded in Salalah, Oman. After that, a low pressure quickly intensified into a deep depression and peaking as a tropical storm made landfall in Myanmar causing heavy downpour. Five monsoonal depression also formed between June and September, all of them were land depressions.

Cyclogenesis continued with Cyclone Daye which made landfall in Odisha state. Heavy downpour and flood mainly in Malkangiri district and its outer bands also caused heavy rainfall in West Bengal. Following with Daye, Luban and Titli both formed in the Arabian sea and the Bay of Bengal respectively, causing heavy damages in Oman and Andhra Pradesh. Gaja on November 10, also formed and caused extensive damage in Tamil Nadu and Andaman and Nicobar Islands. The season ended with Cyclone Phethai causing agricultural damage and four dead.

== Systems ==
=== Depression ARB 01 ===
- Depression (IMD)
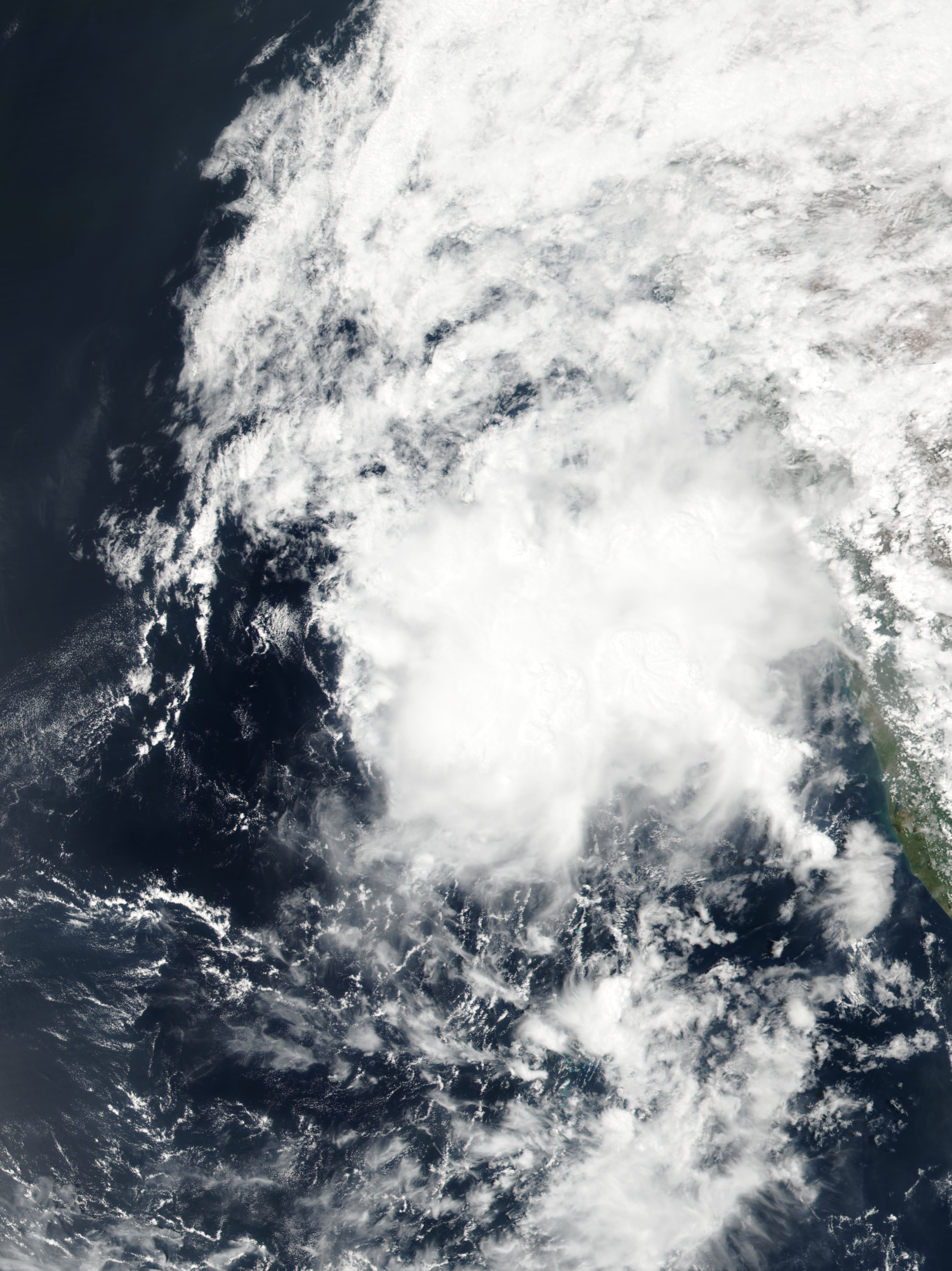
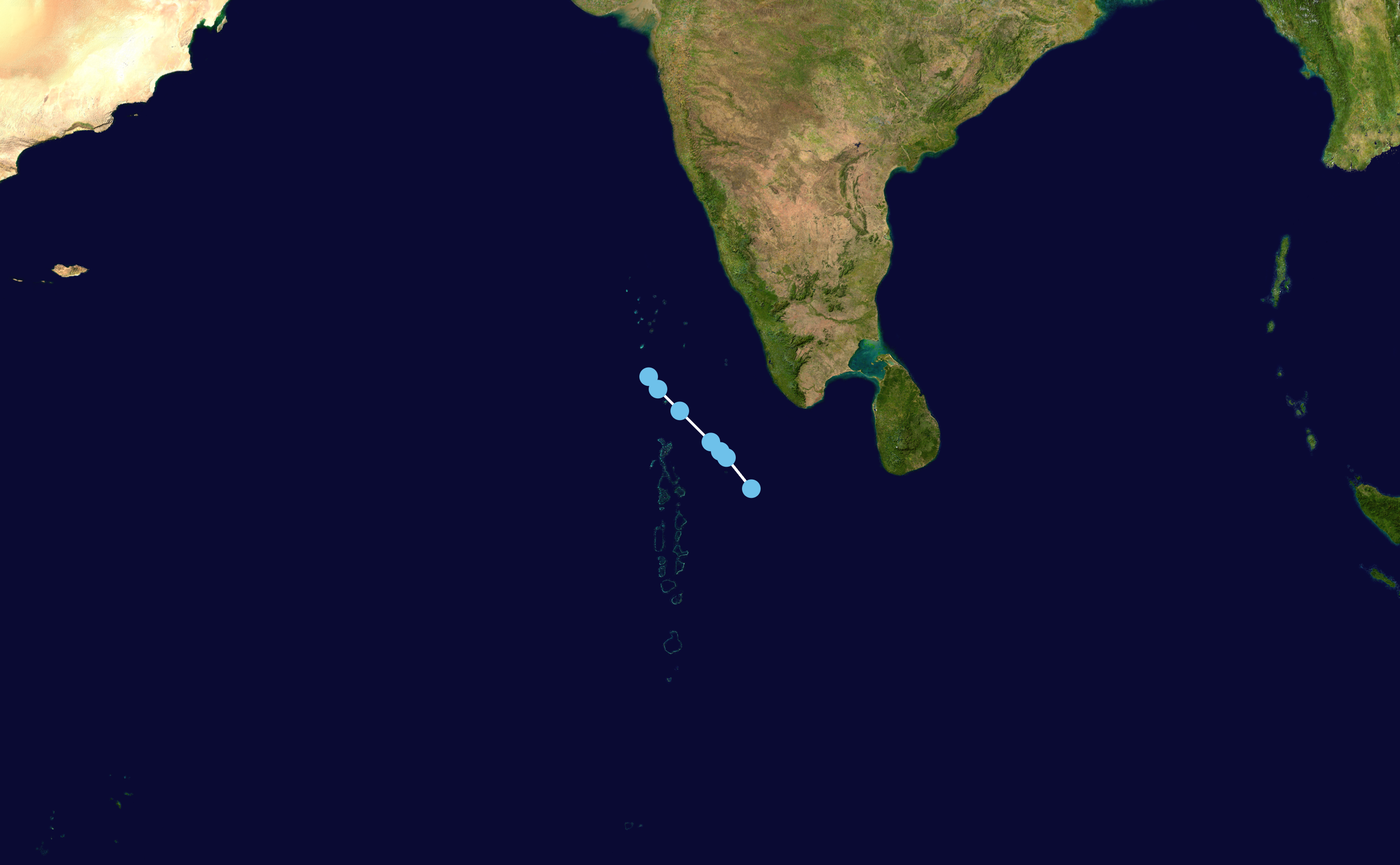
- Duration: March 13 – March 14
- Peak intensity: 45 km/h (30 mph) (3-min); 1006 hPa (mbar)

A trough developed near the equator in the eastern Indian Ocean on March 7. A low-pressure area formed on March 10 to the southwest of Sri Lanka, in an area with warm sea surface temperatures and low wind shear. Moving into the eastern Arabian Sea, the low organized into a depression on March 13 at the low latitude of 5° N. After its formation, the depression encountered cooler, drier air, which prevented the system from strengthening beyond an intensity of 45 km/h (30 mph). Moving northwest, the depression passed between the Maldives and the Lakshadweep islands, and weakened into a remnant low-pressure area on March 15.

Officials advised fishermen to avoid sailing off India's southwest coast for a few days. The depression produced heavy rainfall across southern India. The coastal port city of Thoothukudi near the southern tip of India recorded 200 mm (7.9 in) on March 13, its highest daily precipitation ever recorded. Minicoy Island in Lakshadweep received 177 mm (7.0 in) of rain from the system. Heavy rainfall also occurred in Aryankavu, Kerala, and Chintamani, Karnataka.

=== Cyclonic Storm Sagar ===
- Cyclonic storm (IMD)
- Category 1 tropical cyclone (SSHWS)
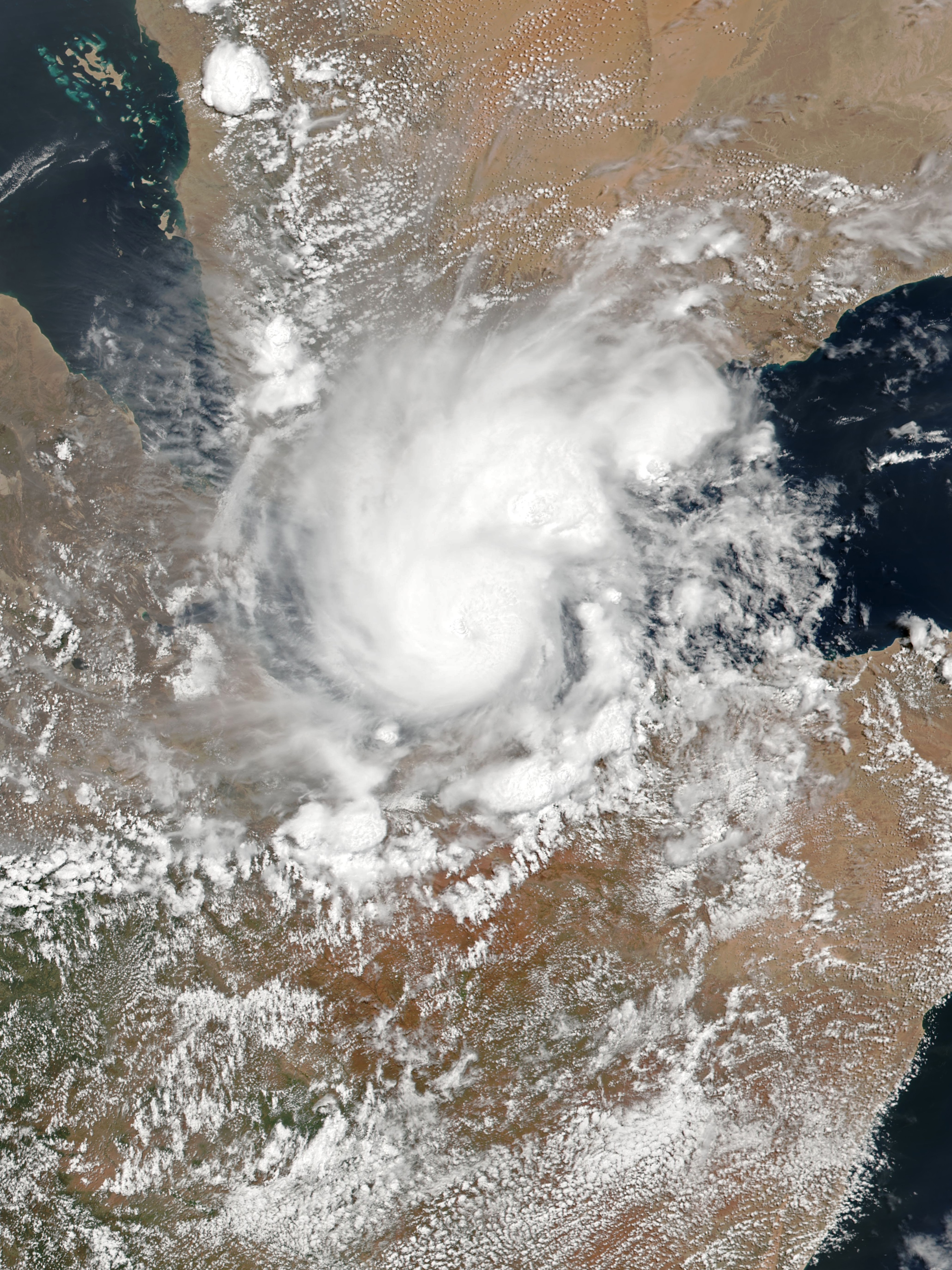
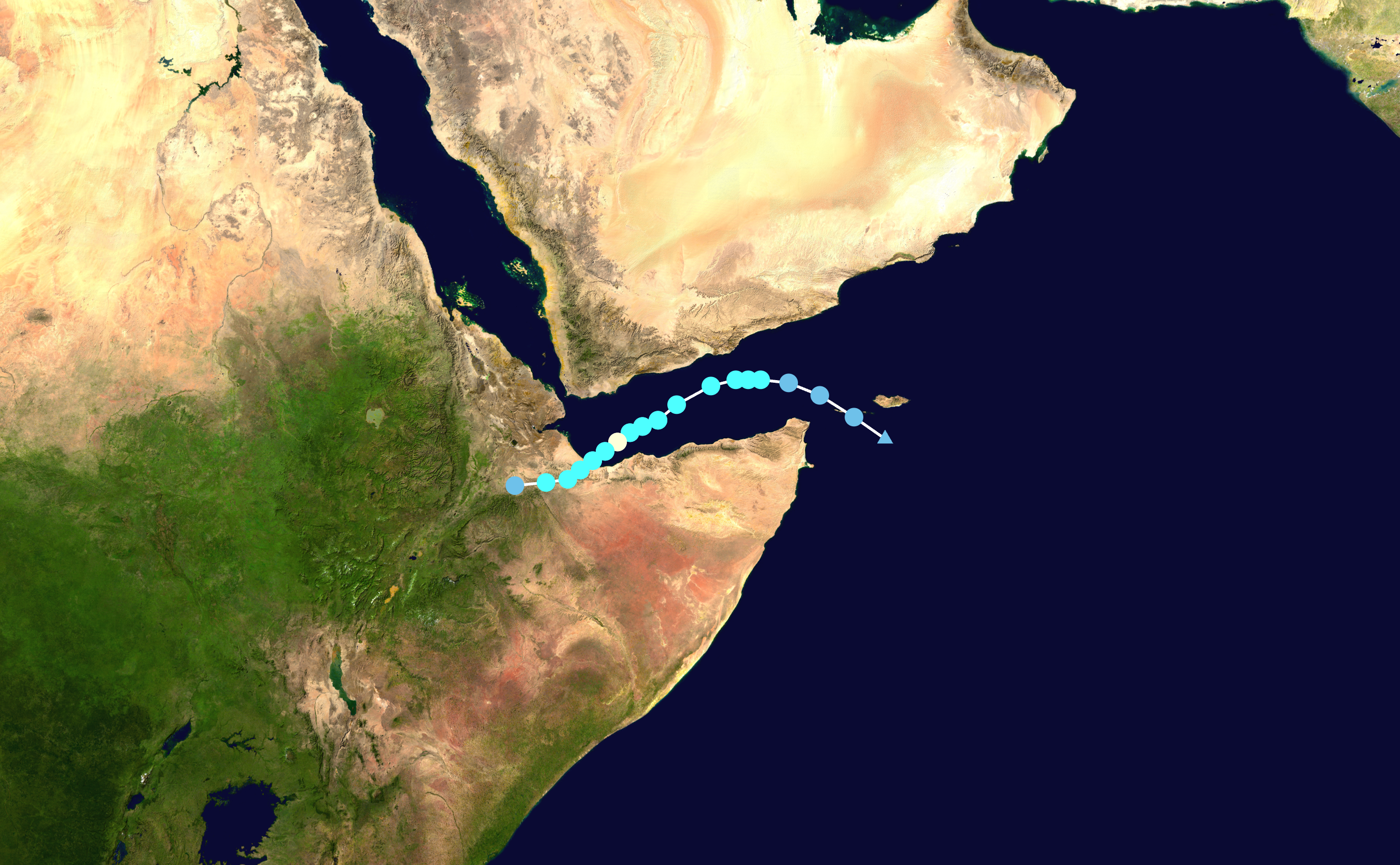
- Duration: May 16 – May 20
- Peak intensity: 85 km/h (50 mph) (3-min); 994 hPa (mbar)

A low-pressure area formed on May 14 near Socotra in the western Arabian Sea. The weather system moved northwestward, steered by a ridge to the northeast and the flow of the regional geography. On May 16, the India Meteorological Department (IMD) classified the low as a depression at 12:00 UTC about 200 km (120 mi) northeast of Cape Guardafui, Somalia. On the same day, the JTWC designated the depression as Tropical Cyclone 01A. The IMD upgraded the system to a cyclonic storm on May 17, naming it Sagar. (Note: The name Sagar (Hindi: सागर, [säːɡɐɾ]) was contributed by India and means "ocean" in Hindi.) The storm entered the Gulf of Aden that day, gradually intensifying while paralleling the coast of Yemen. Sagar developed an eye on microwave imagery, a sign of an intensifying storm. Late on May 18, the IMD estimated Sagar's peak intensity at 85 km/h (55 mph). Around the same time, the JTWC estimated Sagar attained peak 1 minute sustained winds of 120 km/h (75 mph), while located about 165 km (103 mi) south of Aden, Yemen, or about 95 km (59 mi) north of Berbera, Somalia. Sagar weakened slightly before it made landfall near Lughaya in northwestern Somaliland, with winds of 75 km/h (45 mph) according to the IMD. According to the JTWC, Sagar was the strongest tropical cyclone on record to strike Somalia, with estimated 1-minute landfalling winds of 95 km/h (60 mph). The storm also made the westernmost landfall in the North Indian Ocean, surpassing a tropical storm in 1984, which took a nearly identical track to the east. Sagar rapidly weakened over land, degenerating into a low-pressure area over eastern Ethiopia on May 20.

The cyclone first affected Socotra, and later the Yemeni mainland, producing locally heavy rainfall and flooding. High winds from Sagar contributed to a house fire near Aden, resulting in one fatality. In parts of northern Somalia and Somaliland, Sagar dropped a years' worth of heavy rainfall, or around 200 mm (7.9 in), resulting in deadly flash flooding. The floods washed out farms, livestock, boats, and houses, forcing families to evacuate. Roads, medical facilities, and other infrastructure were also damaged. Three people died in Puntland and another 50 people died in Somaliland due to Sagar. In neighboring Djibouti, flooding from the storm damaged about 10,000 houses, with damage in the country estimated at US$30 million. Two people died in the country. In the Somali Region of eastern Ethiopia, Sagar produced strong winds and heavy rainfall, resulting in flooding and landslides. Near the border of SNNPR and Oromia, a landslide killed 23 people.

=== Extremely Severe Cyclonic Storm Mekunu ===
- Extremely severe cyclonic storm (IMD)
- Category 3 tropical cyclone (SSHWS)
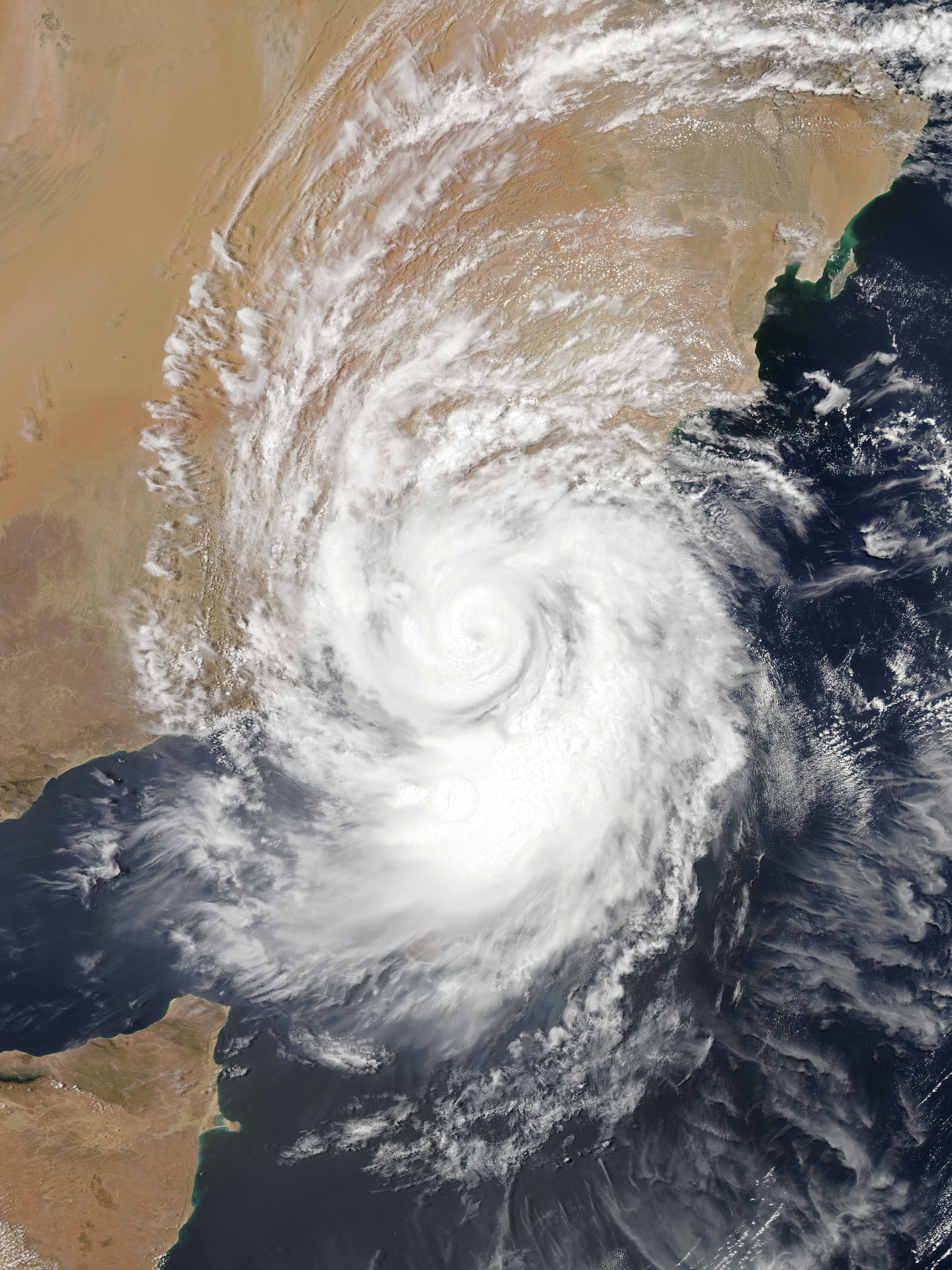
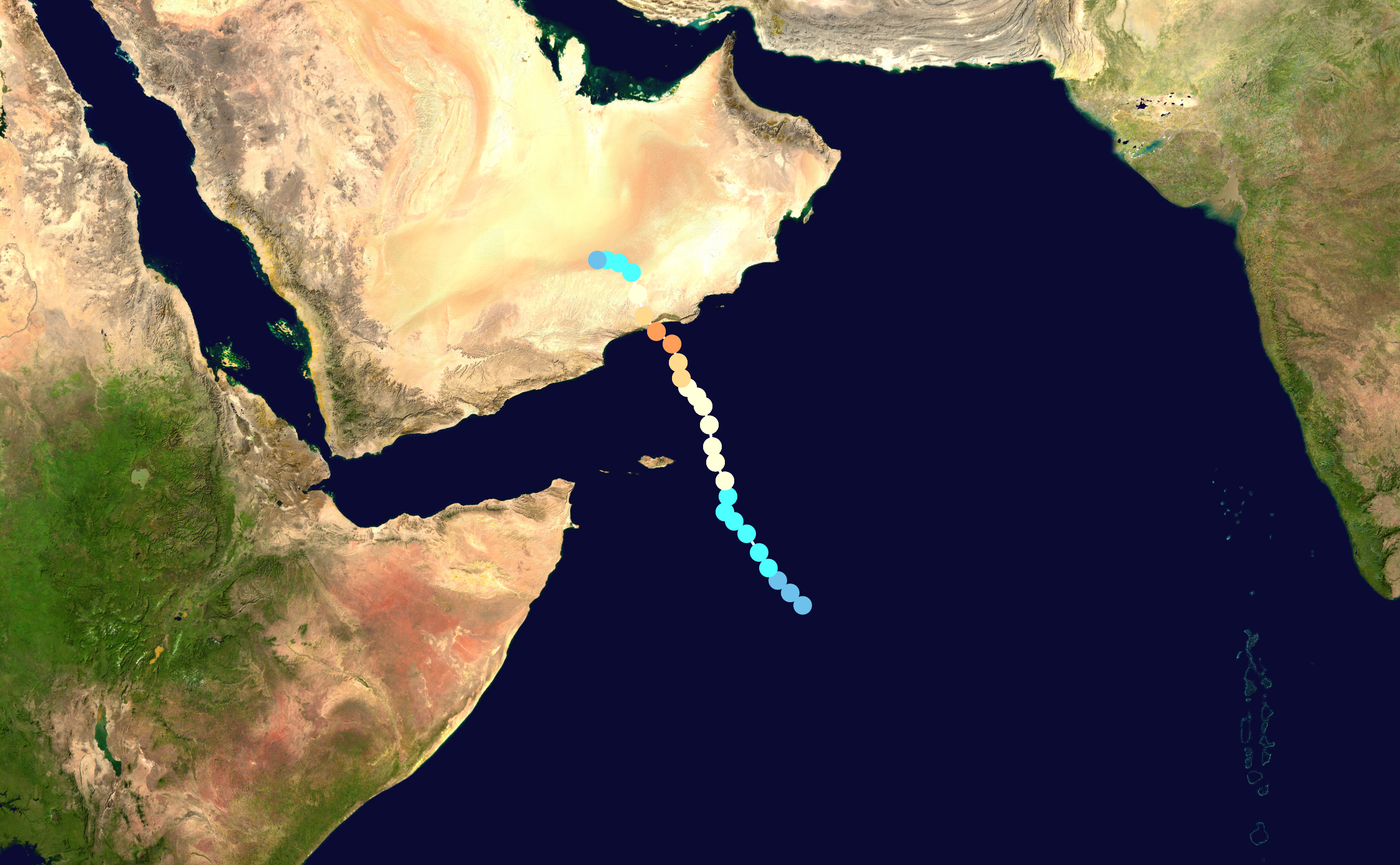
- Duration: May 21 – May 27
- Peak intensity: 175 km/h (110 mph) (3-min); 960 hPa (mbar)

An area of convection developed to the northwest of the Maldives on May 18. Over the next two days, it became better organized and the IMD reported that it had developed into a low-pressure area on May 20, giving it the identifier ARB 03. The system slowly drifted northwestwards into favorable environment for tropical cyclogenesis and developed good outflow. The JTWC issued a TCFA on May 21 after convective bands began to wrap into the broad low-level circulation center (LLCC). Around the same time, the IMD had announced that the system intensified into a depression. Over the next 24 hours, the depression continued to drift further northwestwards into warm waters and faced low vertical wind shear. As a result, it continued to intensify and the JTWC began tracking it as a tropical storm. Subsequently, the IMD upgraded it to a deep depression and Cyclonic Storm Mekunu later the same day. (Note: The name Mekunu (Dhivehi: މެކުނު, [mekunu]) was contributed by the Maldives and means "mullet" in Dhivehi.) Multi-spectral satellite imagery revealed that Mekunu had developed an eye as early as May 23, at which time the IMD upgraded it to a severe cyclonic storm. Benefiting from favorable environmental conditions, the cyclone became more symmetric, intensifying into a very severe cyclonic storm six hours later. The cyclone continued to track northwestward under the influence of a subtropical ridge. On May 25, it reached its peak intensity as an extremely severe cyclonic storm, with the JTWC estimating peak 1-minute sustained winds of 185 km/h (115 mph), equivalent to a Category 3 storm on the Saffir–Simpson scale.

Under the influence of Mekunu, Socotra received widespread rainfall leading to flash flooding and downed power lines. At least 40 people were initially reported to be missing after two ships were capsized off Socotra. Mekunu made landfall on the Omani coast near the city of Salalah at peak intensity. Gusts of 67 mph (108 km/h) were recorded at the Salalah Airport before the landfall while areas in the Salalah recorded rainfall of 194 mm (7.6 in). As of 31 May, at least 30 people have died in Oman and Yemen due to Mekunu, including 20 on Socotra, four in Yemen, and six in Oman. Insurance claims in Oman reached ﷼108 million (US$281 million).

=== Deep Depression BOB 01 (03B) ===
- Deep depression (IMD)
- Tropical storm (SSHWS)
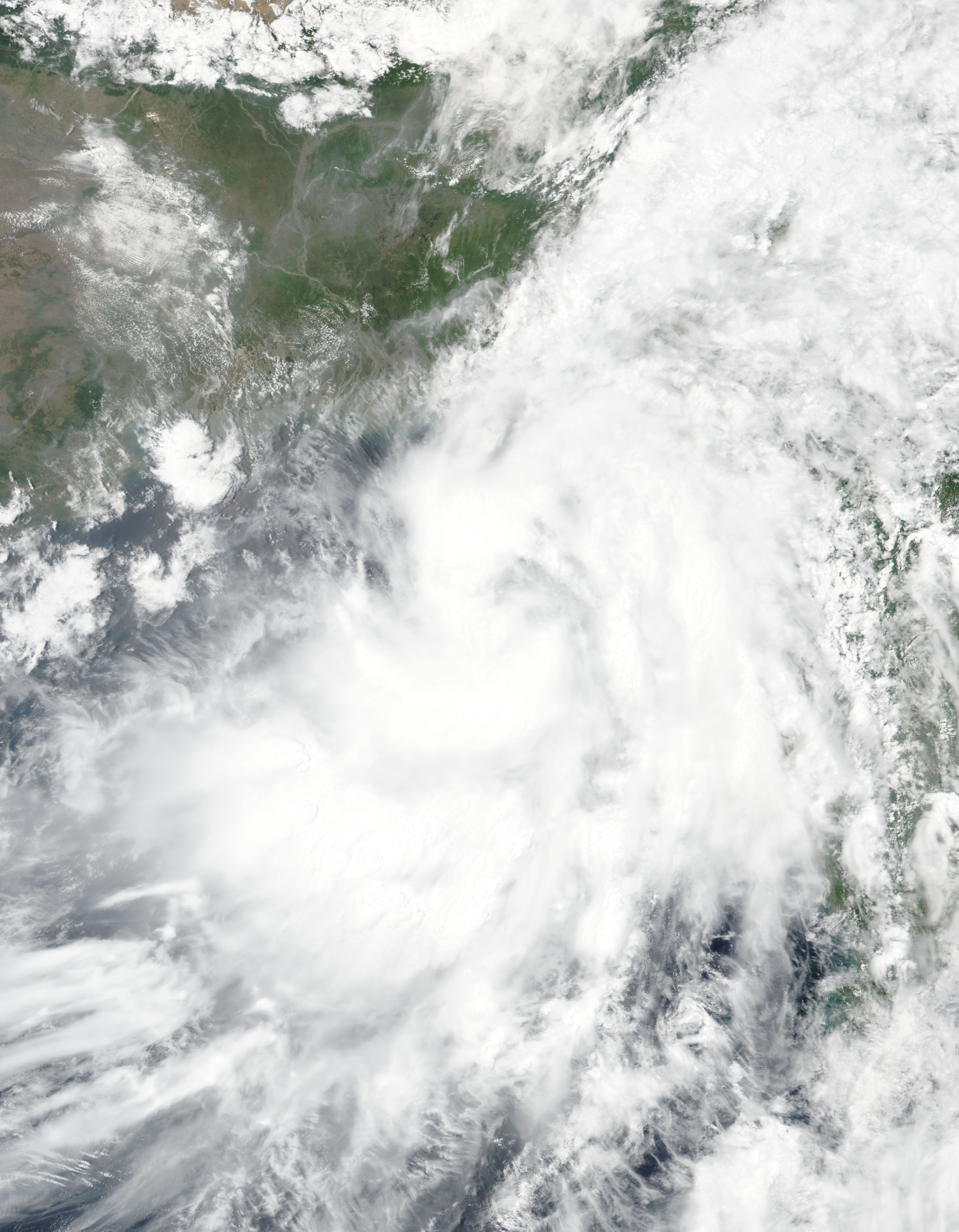
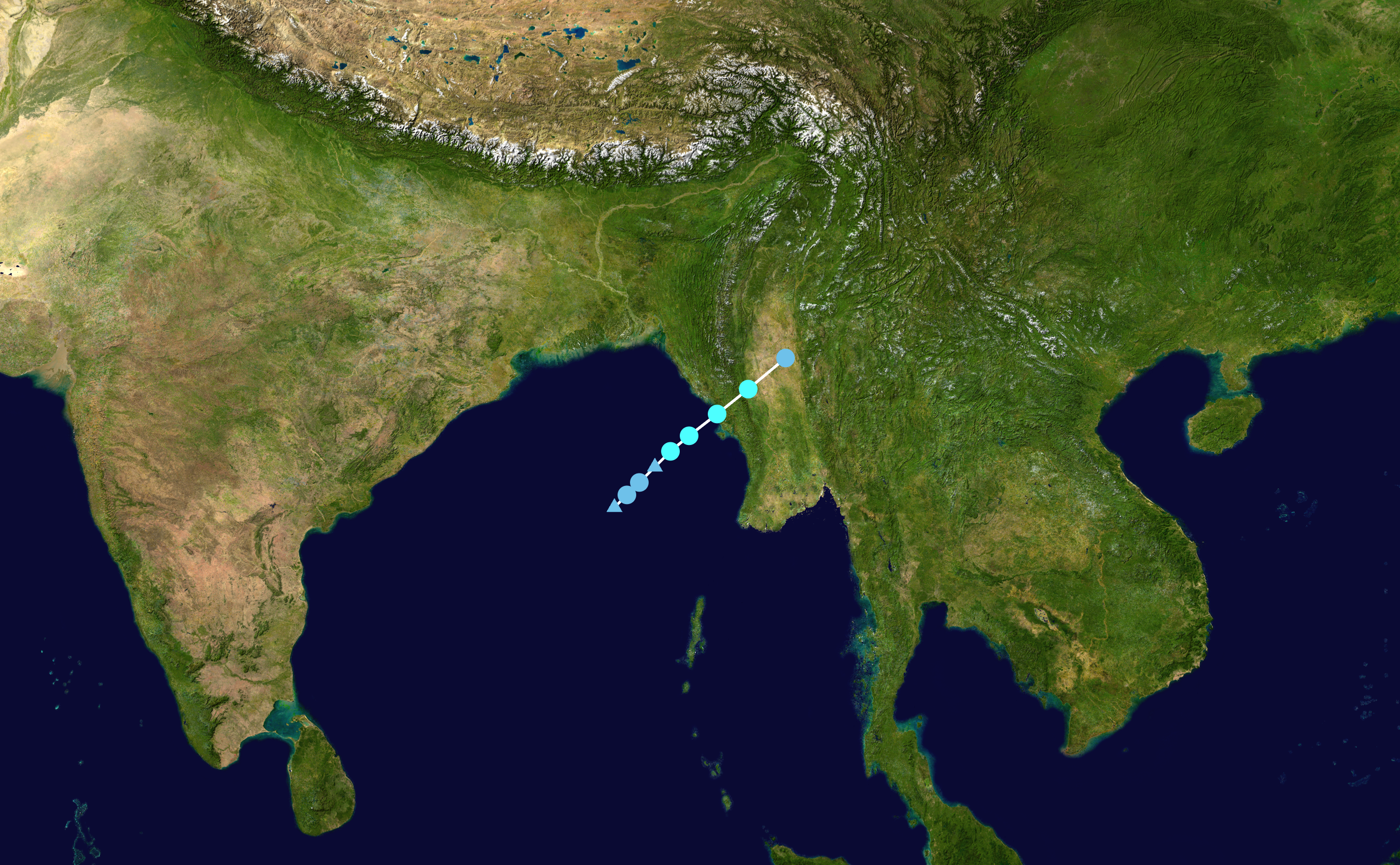
- Duration: May 29 – May 30
- Peak intensity: 55 km/h (35 mph) (3-min); 992 hPa (mbar)

On May 28, a low-pressure area formed over the eastern Bay of Bengal, three days after the IMD first mentioned such a possibility. That day, the JTWC noted a low chance for development, before raising it to a medium chance. The system moved northeastward and organized, becoming a depression at 06:00 UTC on May 29. With warm waters and low wind shear, the system strengthened further. The IMD upgraded the system to a deep depression at 12:00 UTC on May 29, estimating peak winds of 55 km/h (35 mph). The JTWC meanwhile estimated peak winds of 85 km/h (55 mph), designating the system as Tropical Cyclone 03B; however, the agency did not issue any advisories on the cyclone in real time. Late on May 29, the deep depression moved ashore northern Myanmar near Kyaukphyu, and it rapidly weakened over land, degenerating into a low on May 30.

While in its formative stages, the depression brought heavy rainfall to the Andaman and Nicobar Islands, with a peak daily total of 230 mm (9.1 in) recorded in Port Blair. The storm later brought heavy rainfall to northeast India. Ahead of the depression's landfall, Myanmar's Meteorology and Hydrology Department issued a red-code emergency alert warning. High winds and heavy rains destroyed more than 500 homes in the Yangon region, with shelters opened for residents left homeless. The strong wind knocked down trees, cutting power supply in areas.

=== Depression LAND 01 ===
- Depression (IMD)
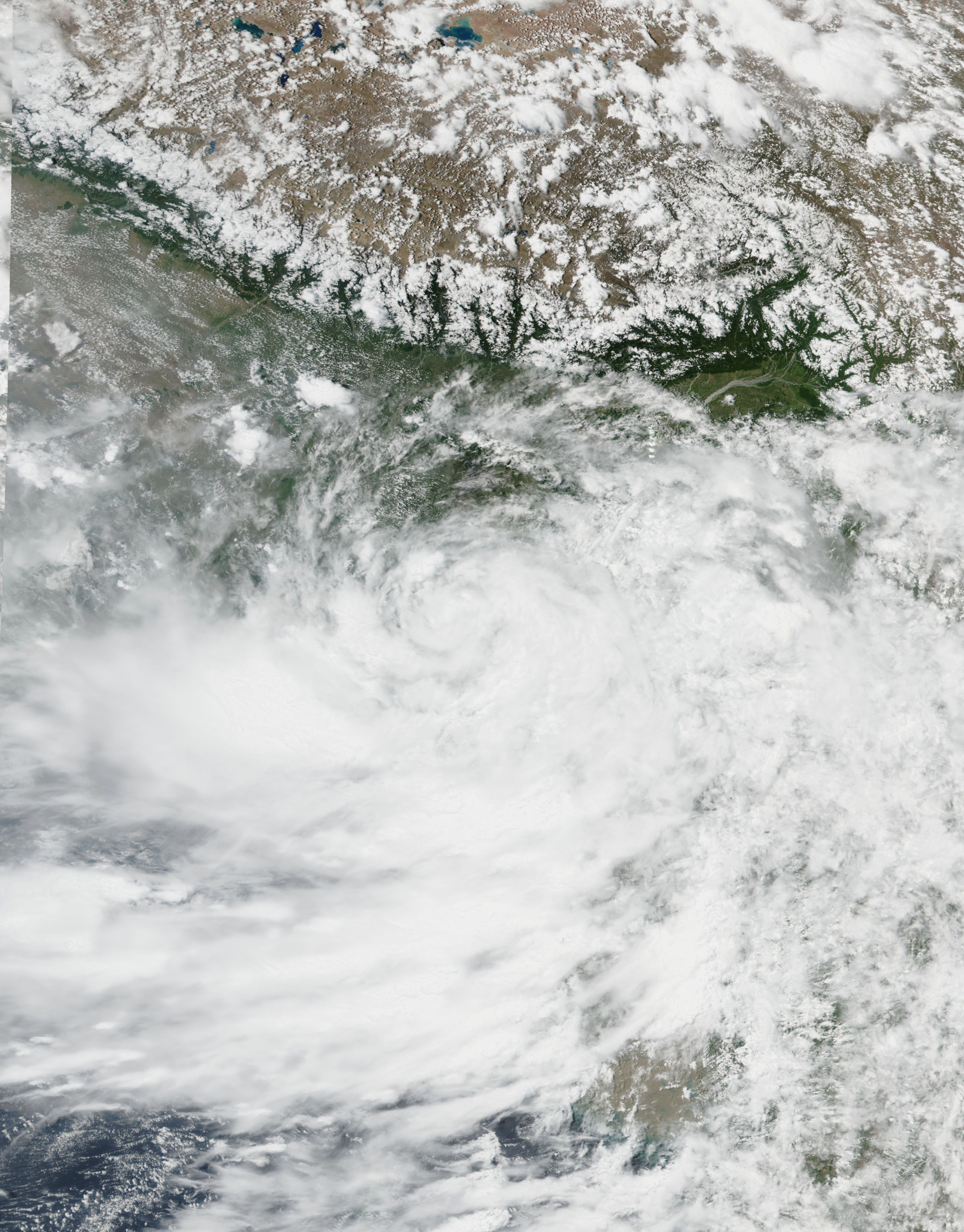
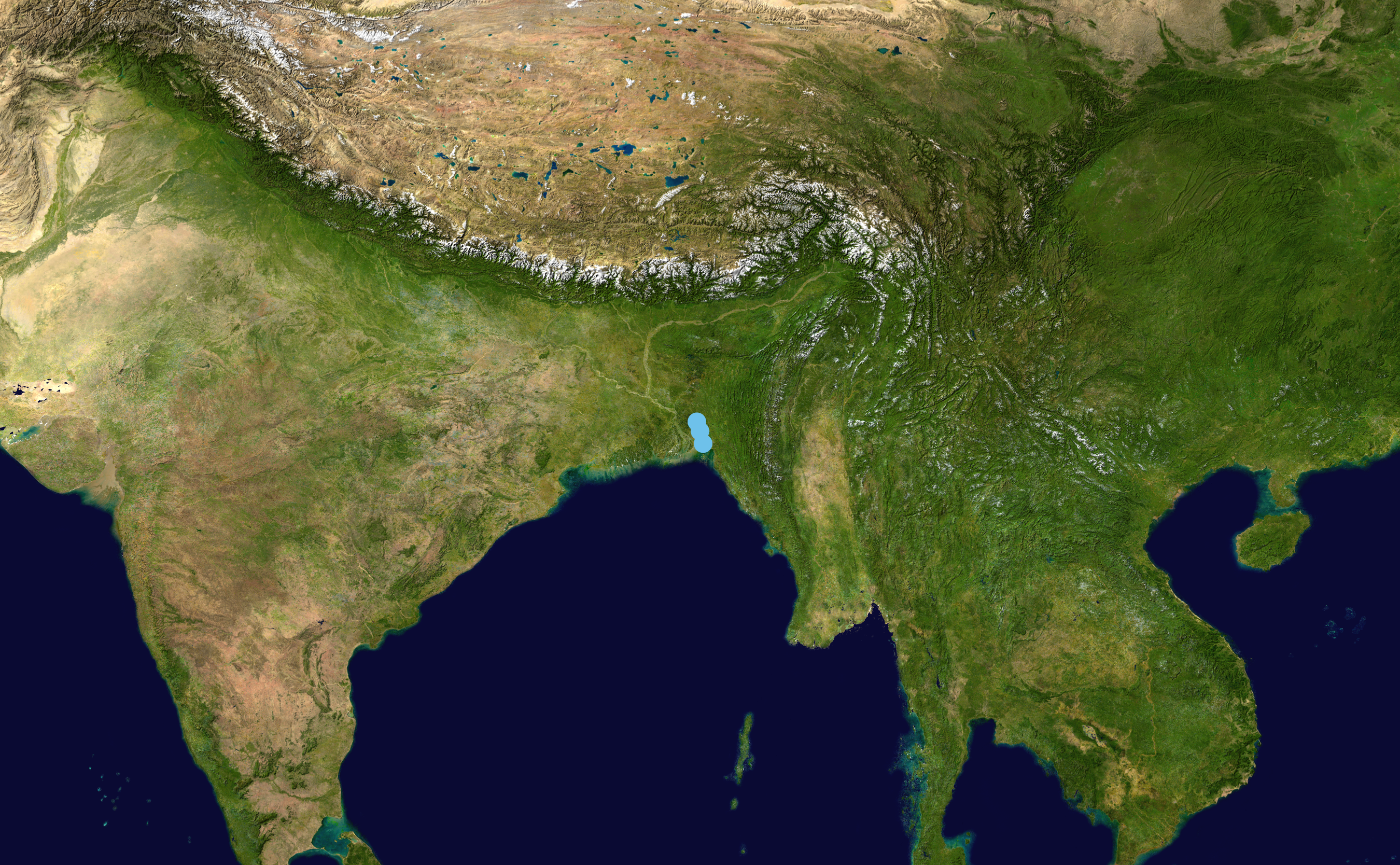
- Duration: June 10 – June 10
- Peak intensity: 45 km/h (30 mph) (3-min); 988 hPa (mbar)

A monsoonal low formed in the northern Bay of Bengal on June 8, which was anticipated by the IMD as early as June 3. Low wind shear and warm waters fueled development as the system moved to the north-northwest. On June 10, the system organized into a depression near the coastline of Bangladesh, with peak winds of 45 km/h (30 mph). A few hours after its formation, the depression moved ashore the country south of Feni. Due to land interaction, the system weakened into a low at 00:00 UTC on June 11.

The depression brought heavy rainfall to Bangladesh and across eastern India. Sabroom in northeastern India recorded 440 mm (17 in) of rainfall over two days. In Bangladesh, two-day rainfall totals reached 150 mm (5.9 in), causing flooding and landslides. The flooding closed some roads and forced more than 29,000 people to be evacuated. At least 12 people died related to the floods, including two people in Rohingya refugee camps in southeastern Bangladesh. Nearly 900 refugee camps were damaged, along with 200 latrines, two health facilities, and two food distribution centers. Heavy rains also caused flooding in the port city of Chittagong.

=== Depression LAND 02 ===
- Depression (IMD)
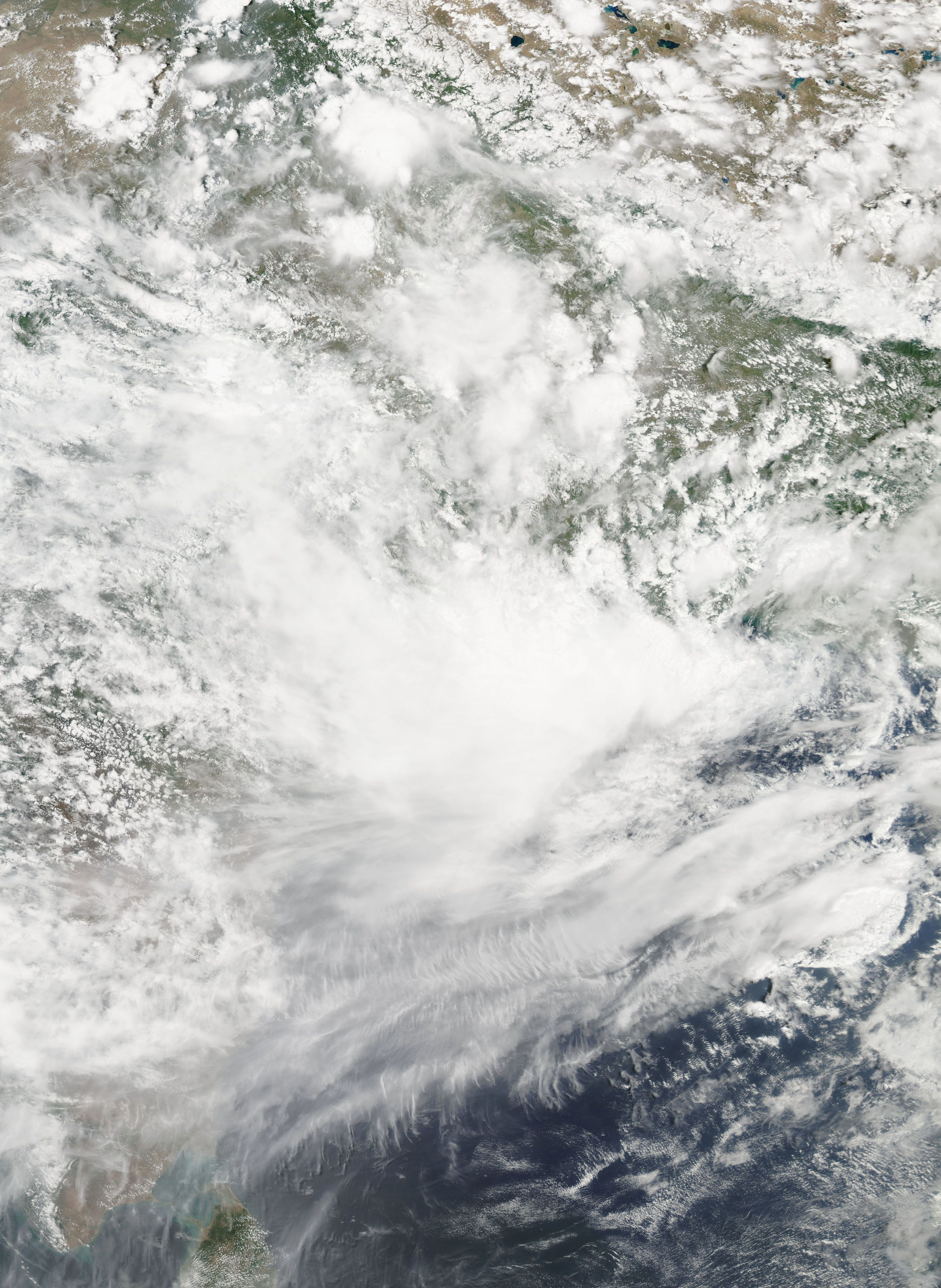
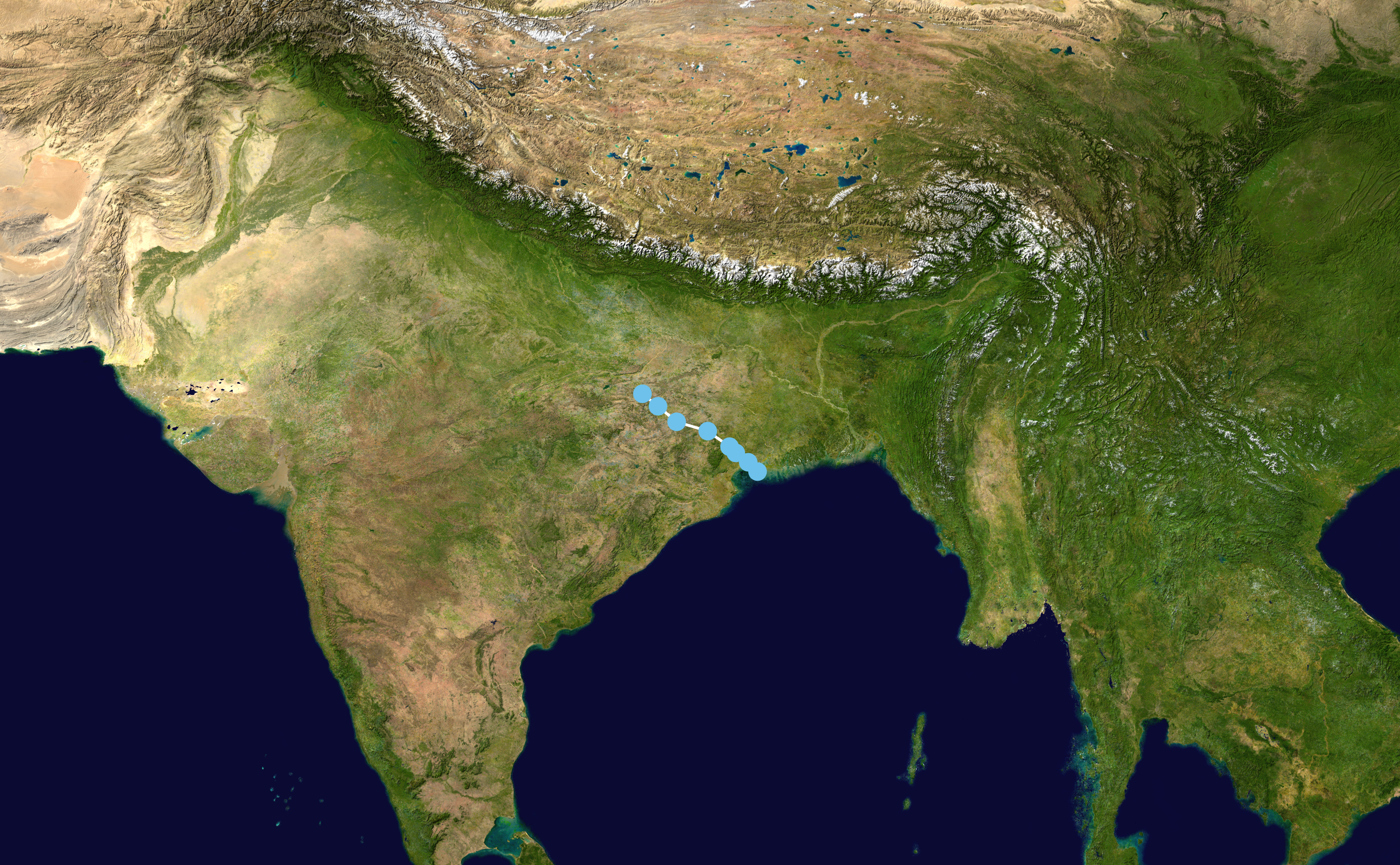
- Duration: July 21 – July 23
- Peak intensity: 45 km/h (30 mph) (3-min); 988 hPa (mbar)

A monsoonal low formed on July 19 in the northern Bay of Bengal. With favorable conditions such as warm water temperatures, the system gradually organized, becoming a depression on July 21 just off the coast of eastern India. The system only attained peak winds of 45 km/h (30 mph), as it soon after moved ashore the Indian coastline near the borders of Odisha and West Bengal. Continuing to the northwest, the depression maintained a flow of moisture that helped sustain its intensity for 36 hours over land, before the system weakened into a low on July 23 over Jharkhand. The depression dropped torrential rainfall over eastern India, reaching as far west as Rajasthan. The highest 24 hour total was 620 mm (24 in) in Burla in Odisha, resulting in flooding. Flood-related incidents killed five people in Odisha.

=== Depression LAND 03 ===
- Depression (IMD)
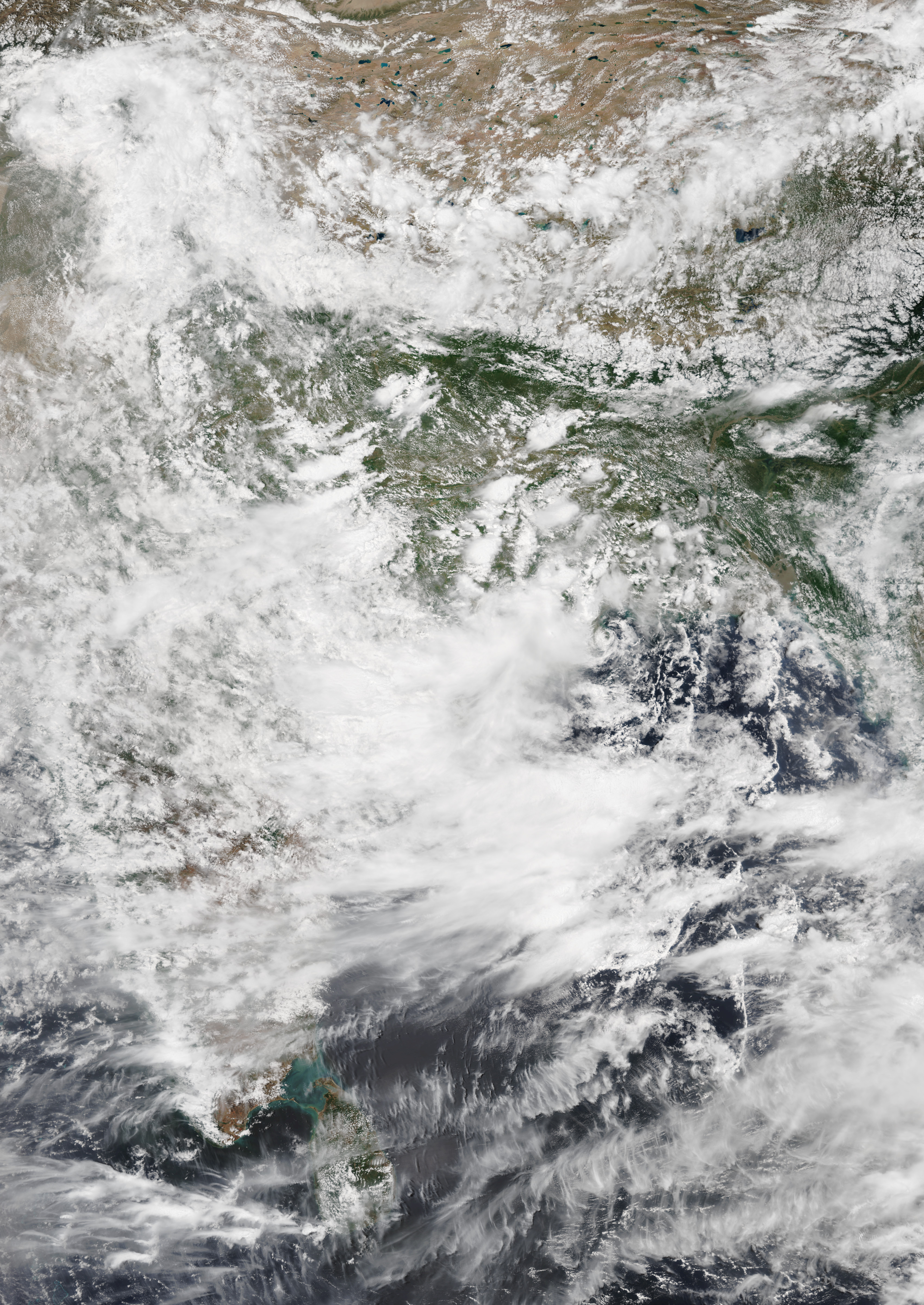
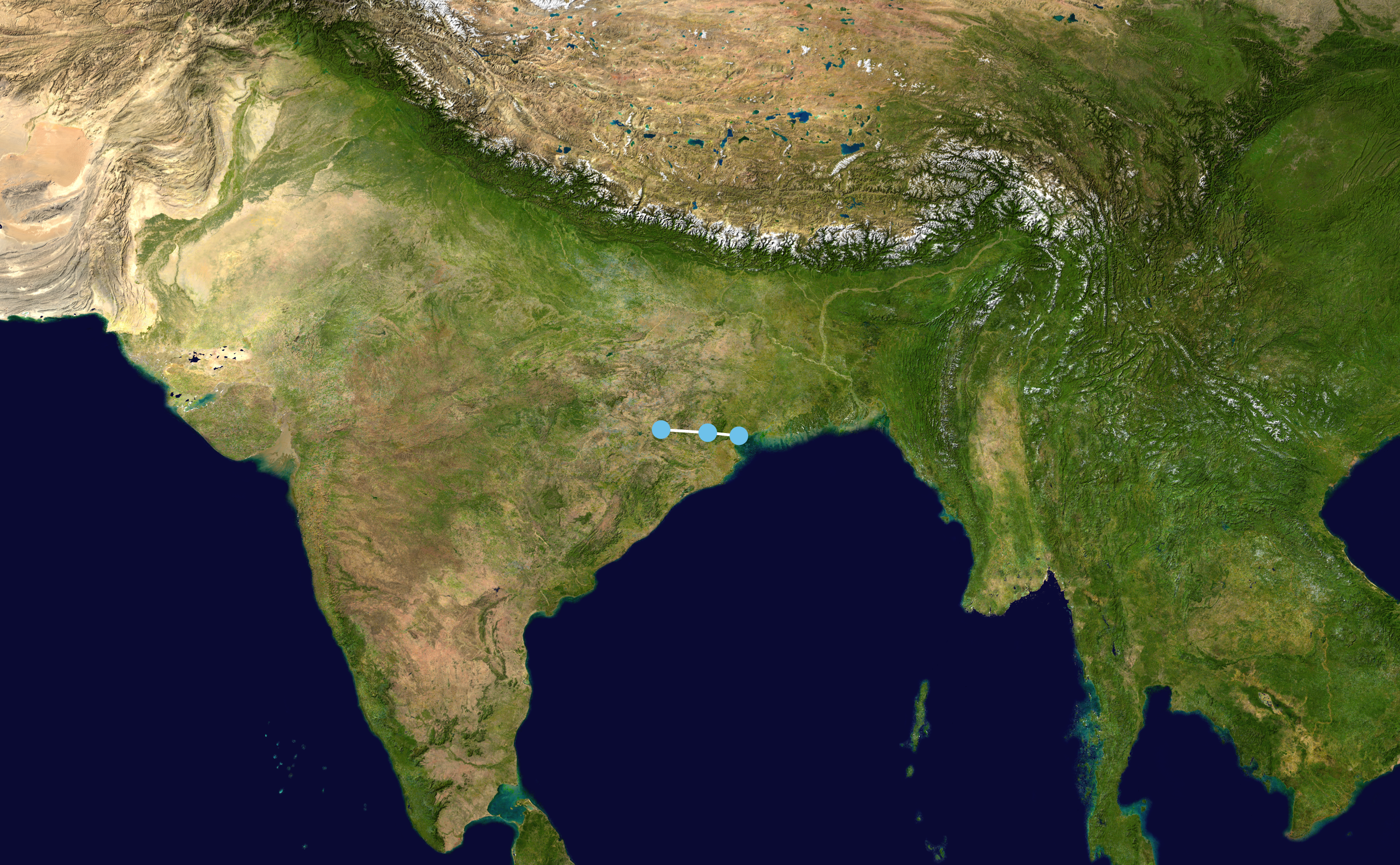
- Duration: August 7 – August 8
- Peak intensity: 45 km/h (30 mph) (3-min); 992 hPa (mbar)

A monsoonal low formed in the northwestern Bay of Bengal on August 6. With low wind shear and high water temperatures, the system quickly organized into a depression by August 7, located a short distance off eastern India. The system soon after moved ashore near the border of Odisha and West Bengal, failing to intensify beyond winds of 45 km/h (30 mph). The depression moved across northern Odisha and weakened into a low on August 8 over Chhattisgarh. Heavy rainfall accompanied the depression across India, reaching as far west as Rajasthan. The highest 24 hour rainfall total was 390 mm (15 in) in Puri.

=== Depression LAND 04 ===
- Depression (IMD)
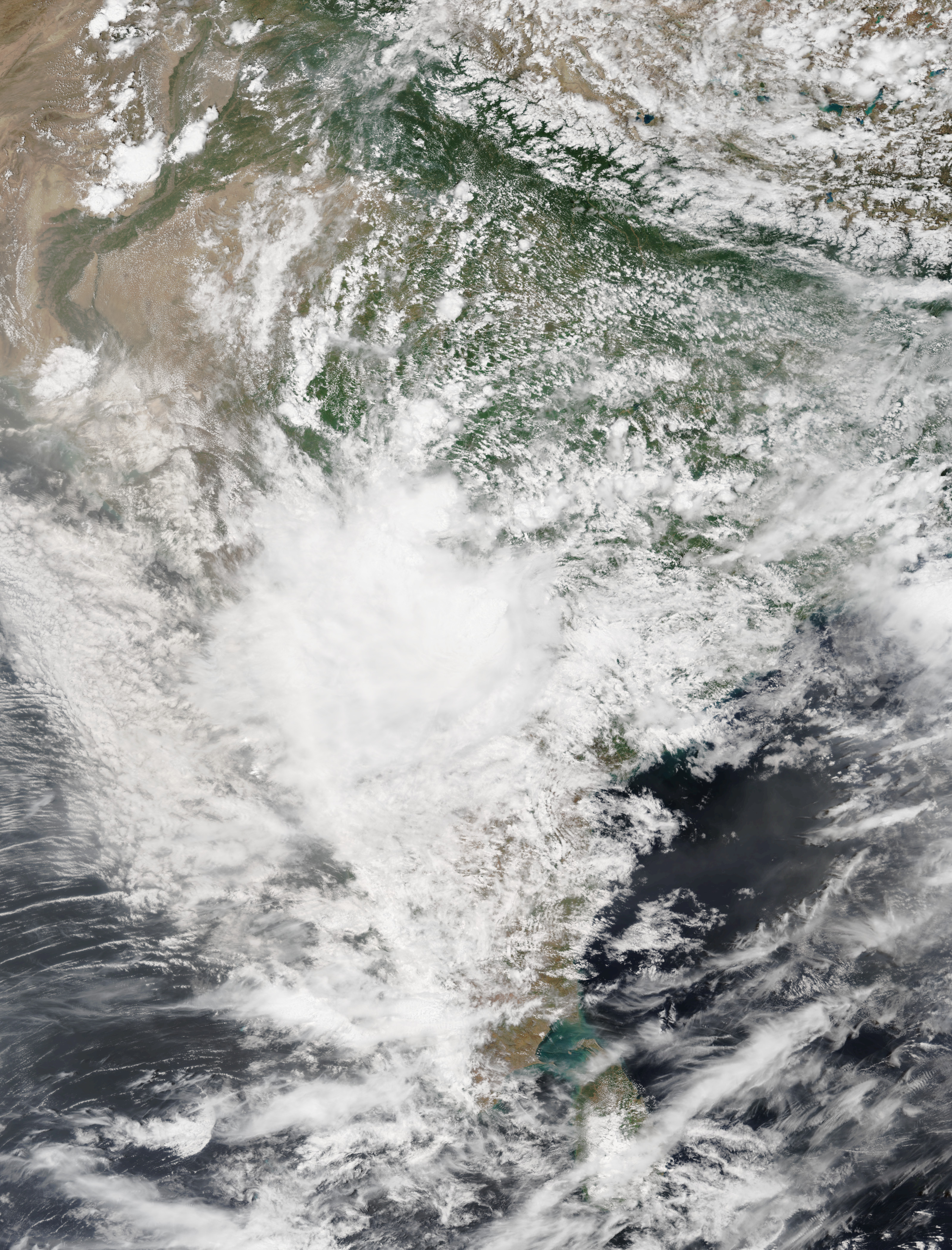
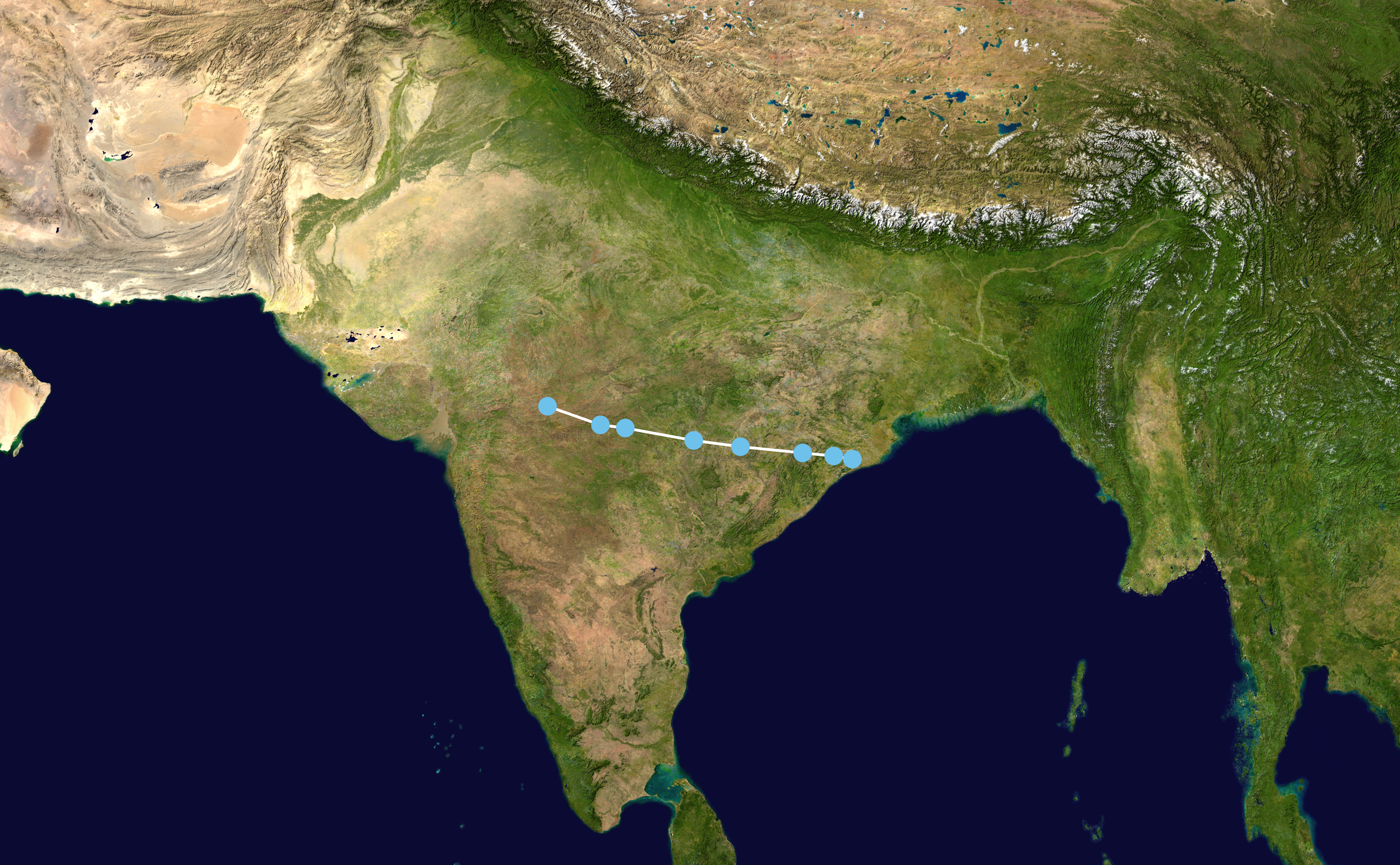
- Duration: August 15 – August 17
- Peak intensity: 45 km/h (30 mph) (3-min); 993 hPa (mbar)

On August 13, a low formed in the northwestern Bay of Bengal from a circulation that was present for the prior four days. The system organized as it moved west-northwestward toward the Indian coastline, becoming a depression on August 15 near the coastline of Odisha, with winds of 45 km/h (30 mph). The depression progressed across central India, weakening into a low on August 17 over Madhya Pradesh. Along its path, the depression dropped heavy rainfall, with a peak 24 hour total of 400 mm (16 in) in Bhopalpatnam in Chhattisgarh state. In Odisha, the heavy rainfall prompted the cancelation of Independence Day activities at schools.

=== Deep Depression LAND 05 ===
- Deep depression (IMD)
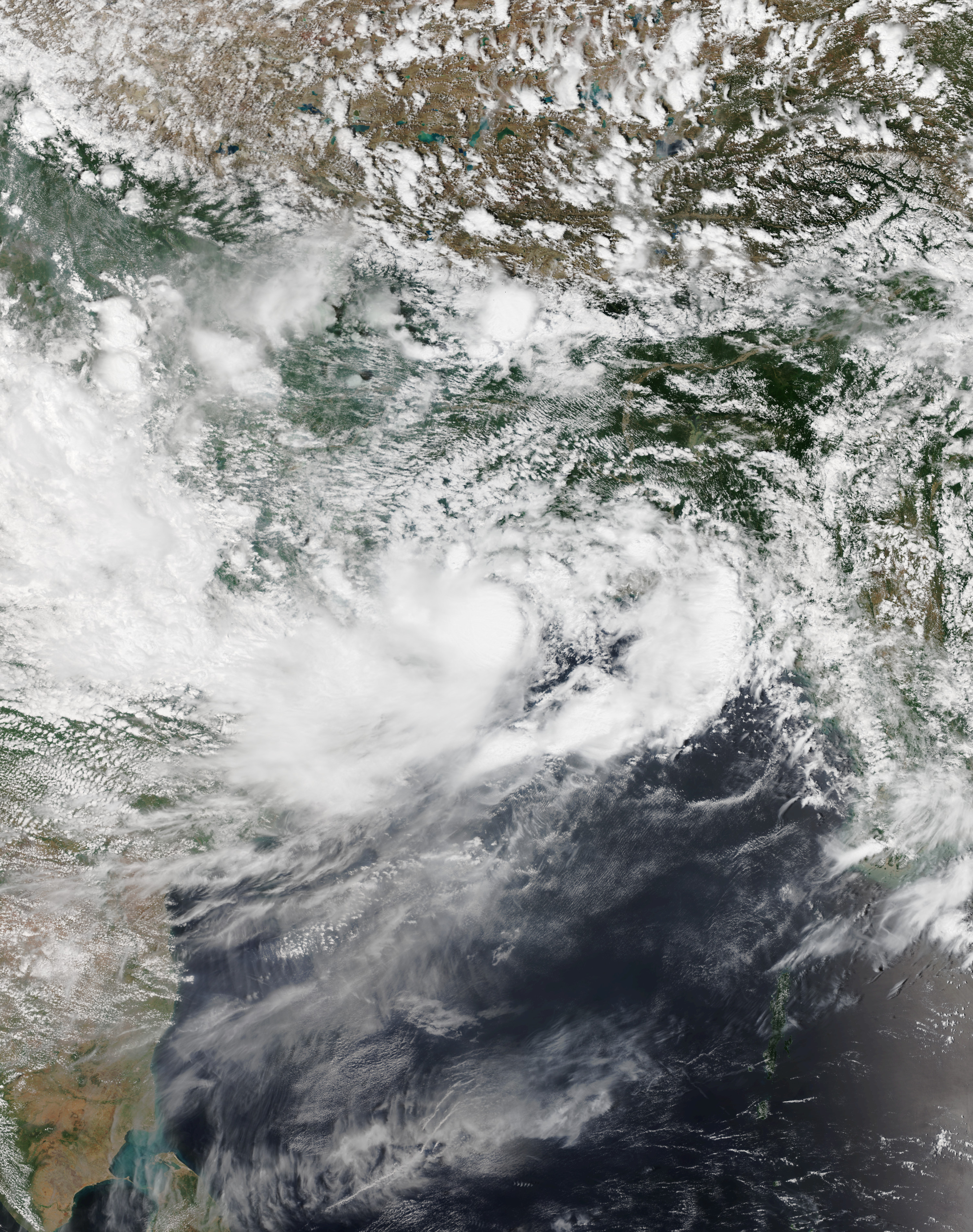
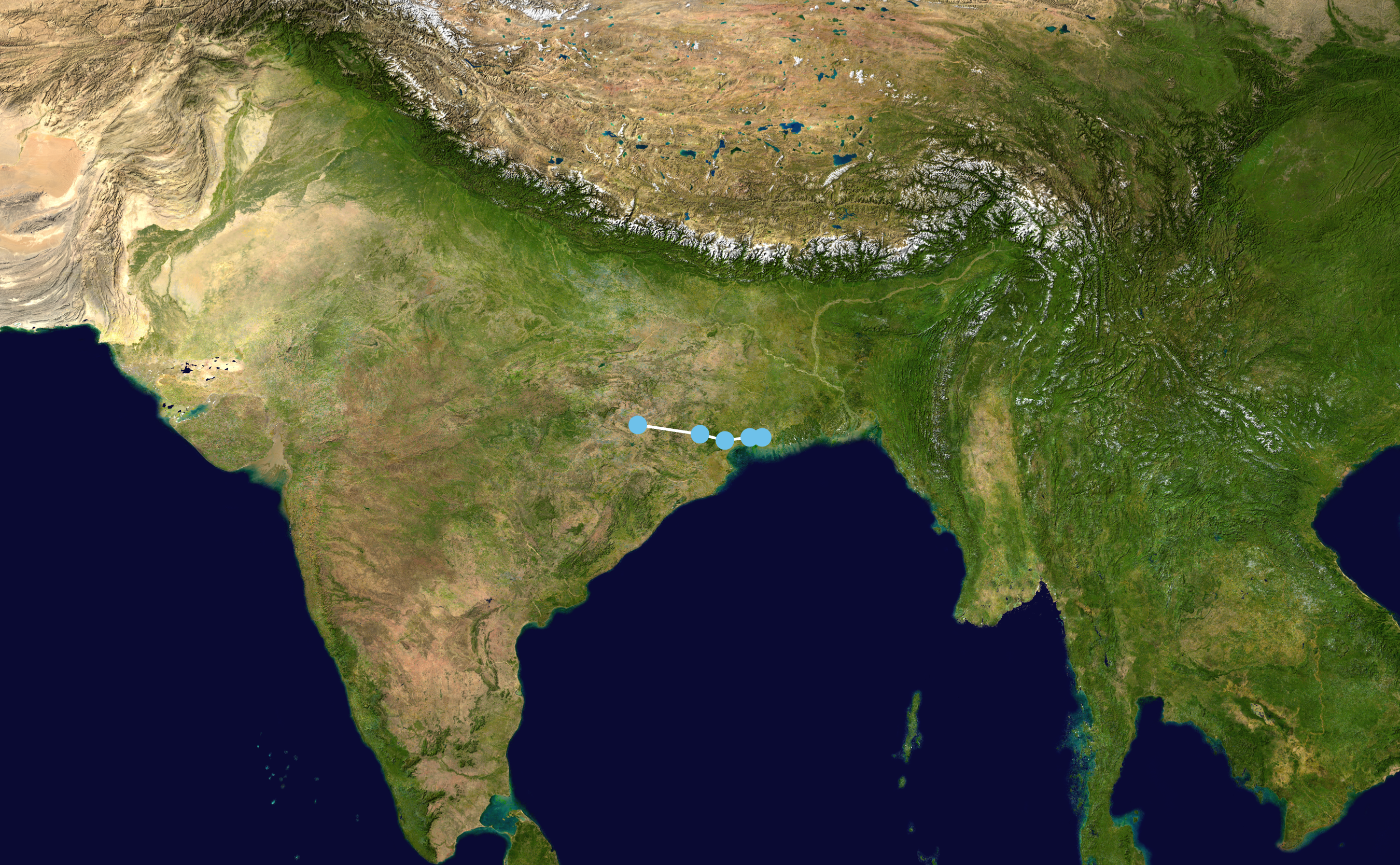
- Duration: September 6 – September 7
- Peak intensity: 55 km/h (35 mph) (3-min); 990 hPa (mbar)

A low-pressure area formed in the northern Bay of Bengal on September 5. With low wind shear and high water temperatures, the system organized further, becoming a depression on September 6, just off the coast of West Bengal. The depression quickly intensified into a deep depression, reaching winds of 55 km/h (35 mph) before moving onshore eastern India. Continuing westward, the deep depression moved across northern Odisha and weakened, degenerating into a low over Chhattisgarh on September 7. The low continued across India and dissipated over Rajasthan. Throughout much of India, the deep depression brought heavy rainfall, with a peak 24 hour precipitation total of 410 mm (16 in) in Paradeep, Odisha.

=== Cyclonic Storm Daye ===
- Cyclonic storm (IMD)
- Tropical storm (SSHWS)
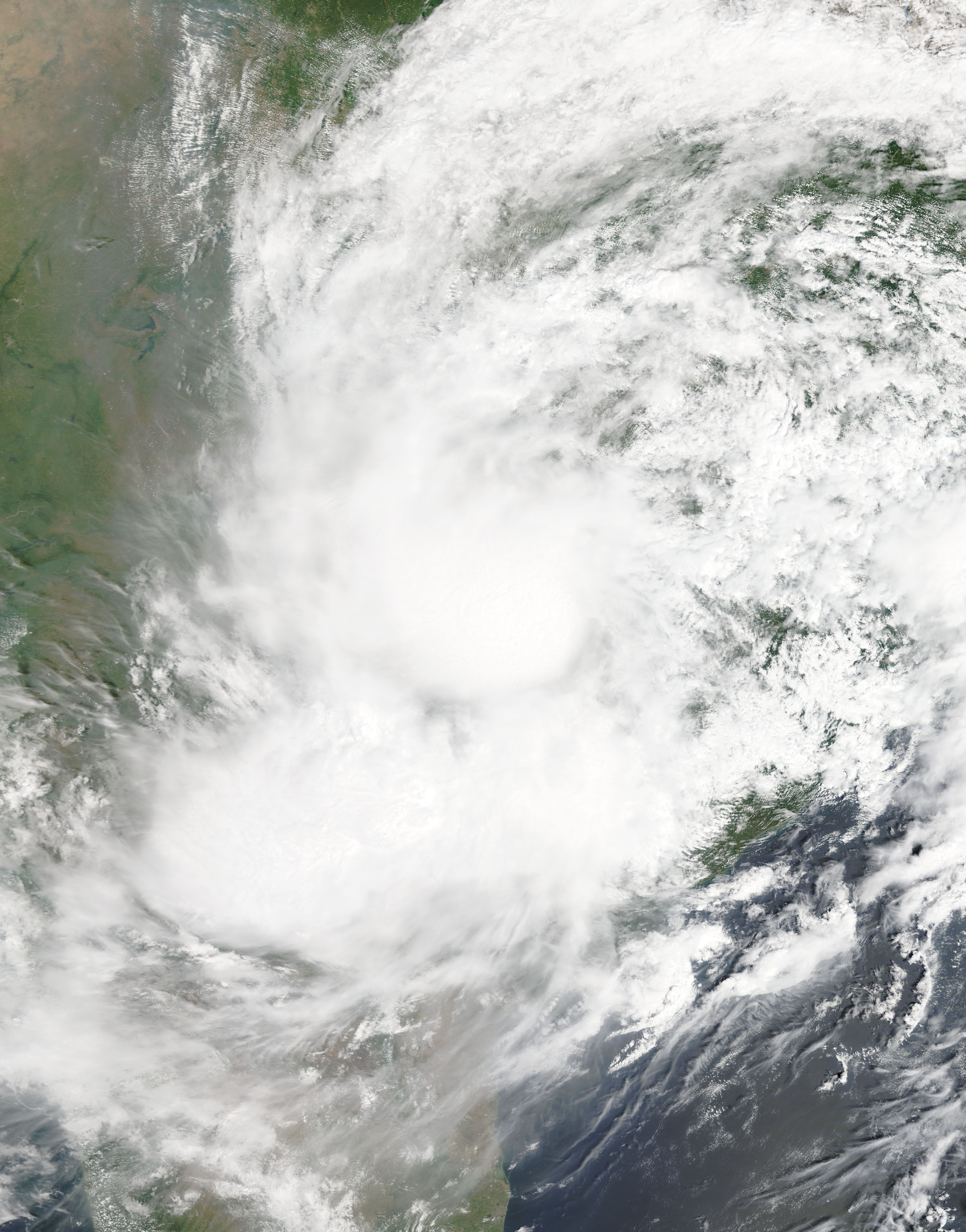
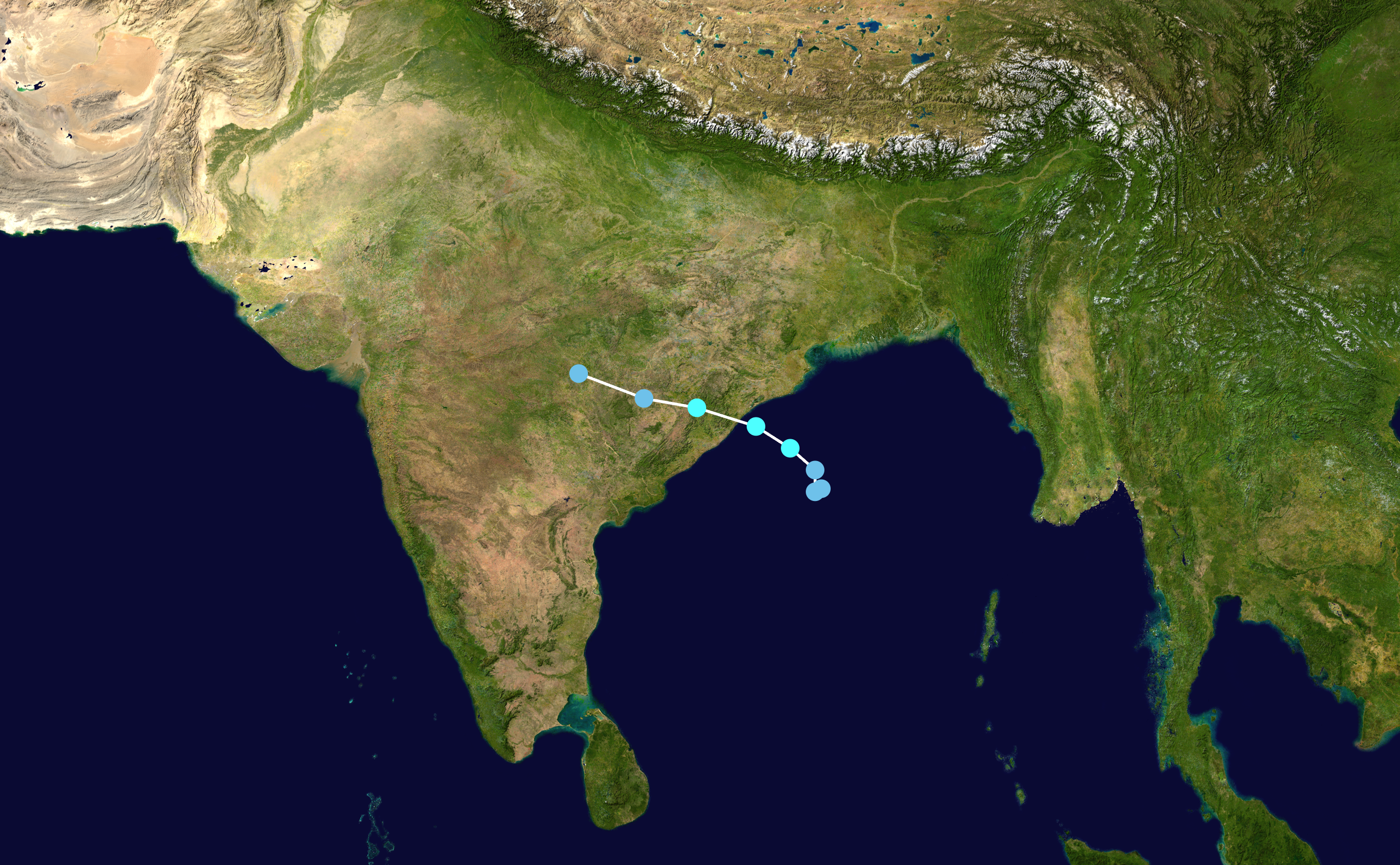
- Duration: September 19 – September 22
- Peak intensity: 65 km/h (40 mph) (3-min); 992 hPa (mbar)

On September 19, a depression formed over the east central Bay of Bengal, receiving the designation BOB 07. Soon afterward, the JTWC has issued a Tropical Cyclone Formation Alert (TCFA). Early on September 20, the storm intensified into a deep depression over the west central Bay of Bengal. The system intensified further, becoming Cyclonic Storm Daye later that day, while situated over the northwestern Bay of Bengal. (Note: The name Daye (Burmese: ဒရယ်, [dəjɛ̀]) was contributed by Myanmar and refers to the Indian hog deer (Axis porcinus) in Burmese.) Early on September 21, Daye made landfall on south Odisha, also impacting the adjoining north Andhra Pradesh coast near Gopalpur, during the morning, local time, resulting in heavy rains and strong winds of 65 to 75 km/h in various districts in the regions. Upon its landfall, Daye brought heavy to very heavy rainfall in various districts of Odisha. Following landfall, Daye weakened into a depression. Over the next two days, Daye continued moving westward, while dropping heavy amounts of rain across India. On September 22, Daye weakened into a well-marked low, with the IMD issuing its final advisory on the system.

Prior to the cyclone's landfall at midnight, local time, on September 21, the government of Odisha deployed emergency teams in Malkangiri, with more teams on standby in Rayagada, Gajapati, and Puri. One NDRF team had each been deployed in Kalahandi, Rayagada, Gajapati, Puri, Nayagarh, and Kandhamal districts, with 17 boats and other emergency equipment. Local cautionary Signal Number LC-III had been kept hoisted at all ports of Odisha when the cyclone was a deep depression.

Malkangiri was worst affected, with many houses submerged. Several parts of outer Malkangiri city and rural areas of the district reportedly received heavy cyclonic rains. Several houses had submerged into water, leaving many people homeless. According to reports, a maximum rainfall total of 284 mm was recorded at Malkangiri by the India Meteorological department (IMD). In Balasore District, the water was flowing above the danger level in the Jalaka River. Water level increased in the Kolab Dam and two gates were opened.

The outer rainbands of the storm dropped extremely heavy rain in the southern parts of West Bengal. Digha recorded 229 mm of rain, Contai received 331 mm of rain, Diamond Harbour recorded 66 mm of rain, Midnapore received 79 mm of rain, and Halisahar recorded 51 mm of rain. Torrential rains and flash floods were also reported in Himachal Pradesh, Uttarakhand, and Punjab, resulting in at least 25 deaths. The floodgates of the famous Sukhna Lake in Chandigarh were opened, for the first time in 10 years.

As Daye weakened into a low-pressure area, the storm interacted with another western disturbance to the north, leading to widespread rainfall in the northern Himalayas and the plains to the south, from September 22–24. Delhi received heavy rains between September 22–24 totaling 58.6 mm, resulting in severe waterlogging. Maximum temperatures in Delhi were up to 6 Degrees Celsius below normal. Amritsar in Punjab received large amounts of rainfall ending early on September 24, with a total of 203.0 mm, while Karnal in Haryana received one of its highest 24-hour rainfall totals in September, with a total of 142.0 mm.

=== Very Severe Cyclonic Storm Luban ===
- Very severe cyclonic storm (IMD)
- Category 2 tropical cyclone (SSHWS)
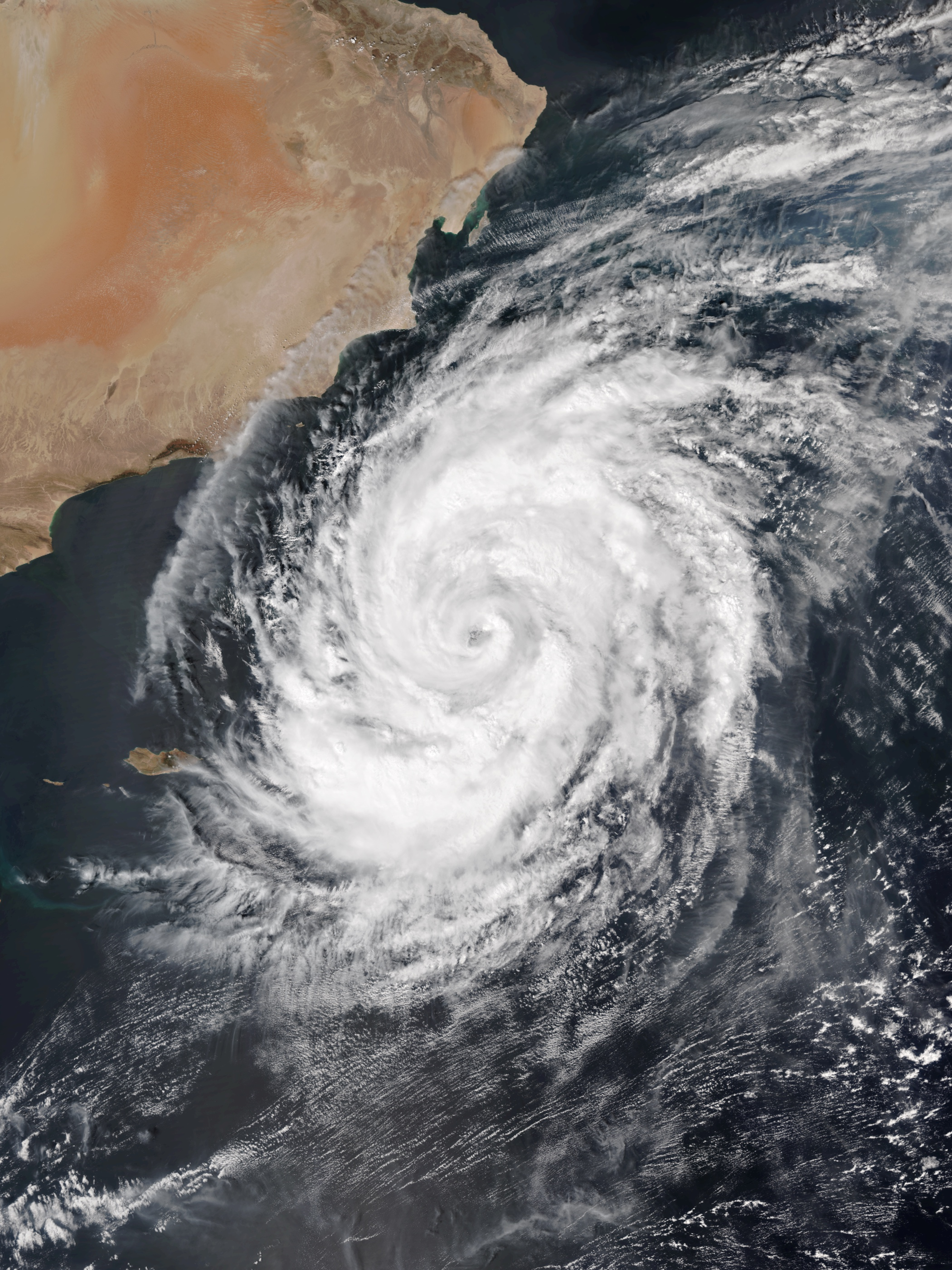
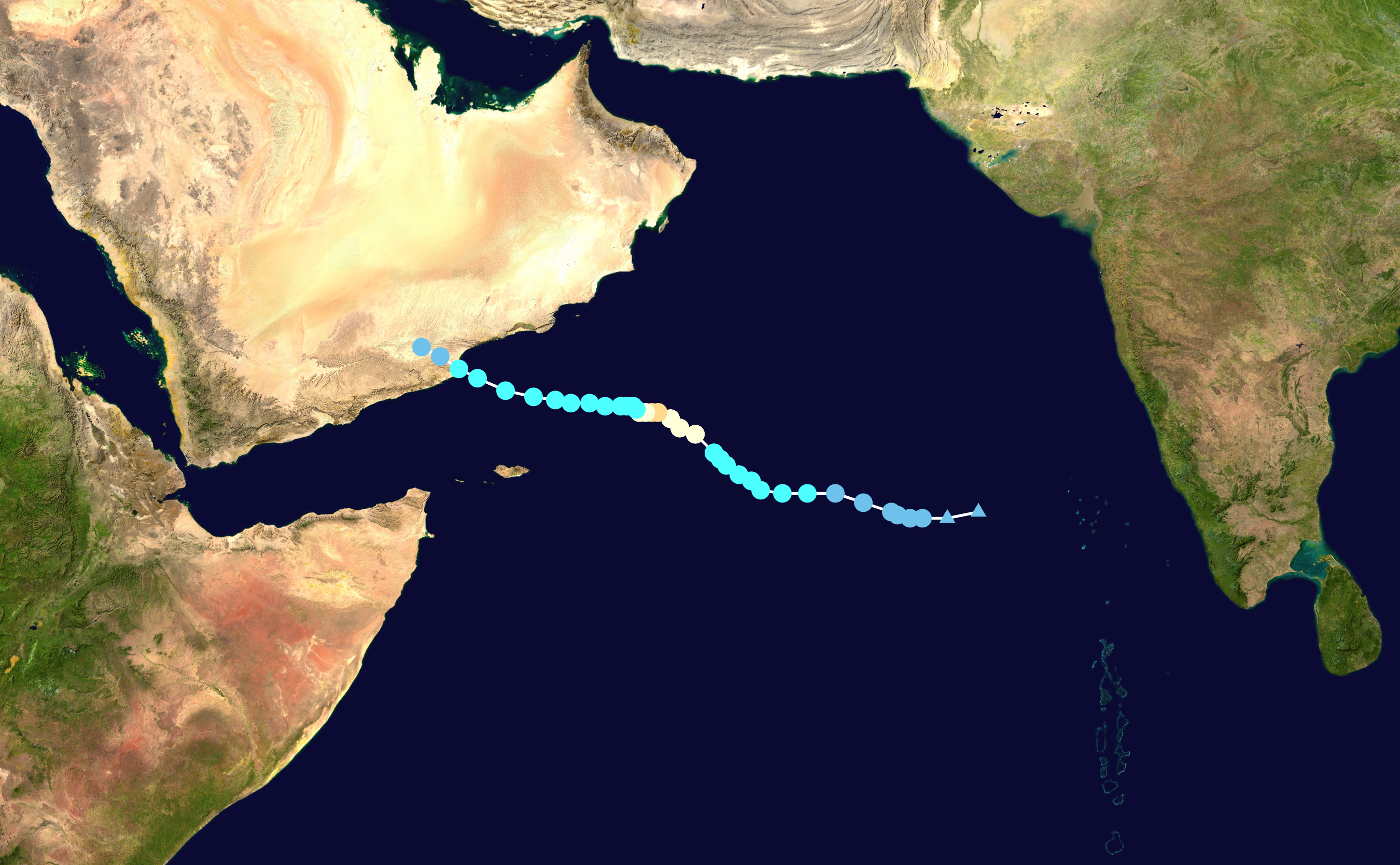
- Duration: October 6 – October 15
- Peak intensity: 140 km/h (85 mph) (3-min); 978 hPa (mbar)

Very Severe Cyclonic Storm Luban (Note: The name Luban (Arabic: لبان, [lubaːn]) was contributed by Oman and refers to an aromatic resin from the frankincense tree (Boswellia sacra) in Arabic.) was the third tropical cyclone to affect the Arabian Peninsula during the 2018 North Indian Ocean cyclone season, after cyclones Sagar and Mekunu in May. Luban developed on October 6 in the central Arabian Sea, and for much of its duration, maintained a general west-northwestward trajectory. On October 10, the India Meteorological Department (IMD) upgraded Luban to a very severe cyclonic storm – equivalent to a Category 2 hurricane – and estimated maximum sustained winds of 155 km/h (100 mph). On October 14, Cyclonic Storm Luban struck Yemen in the midst of a civil war and a cholera outbreak. The storm quickly weakened over the dry, mountainous terrain of the Arabian Peninsula, before dissipating on October 15.

Upon moving ashore, Cyclone Luban produced flooding rains in Somalia, Oman, and Yemen. Luban forced 2,203 families to leave their houses, utilizing 38 schools for shelter. The storm killed 14 people in the country, and injured another 124 people, with 10 people still being missing. Heavy rainfall cut off villages and damaged roads. Damage in the country was estimated at US$1 billion. (Note: All damage totals are in 2018 United States dollars unless otherwise noted.) In Oman, desert rainfall caused a small locust outbreak. Luban coexisted with Cyclone Titli in the Bay of Bengal, marking the first time since 1977 that two storms of such intensity were active at the same time in the North Indian Ocean.

=== Very Severe Cyclonic Storm Titli ===
- Very severe cyclonic storm (IMD)
- Category 3 tropical cyclone (SSHWS)
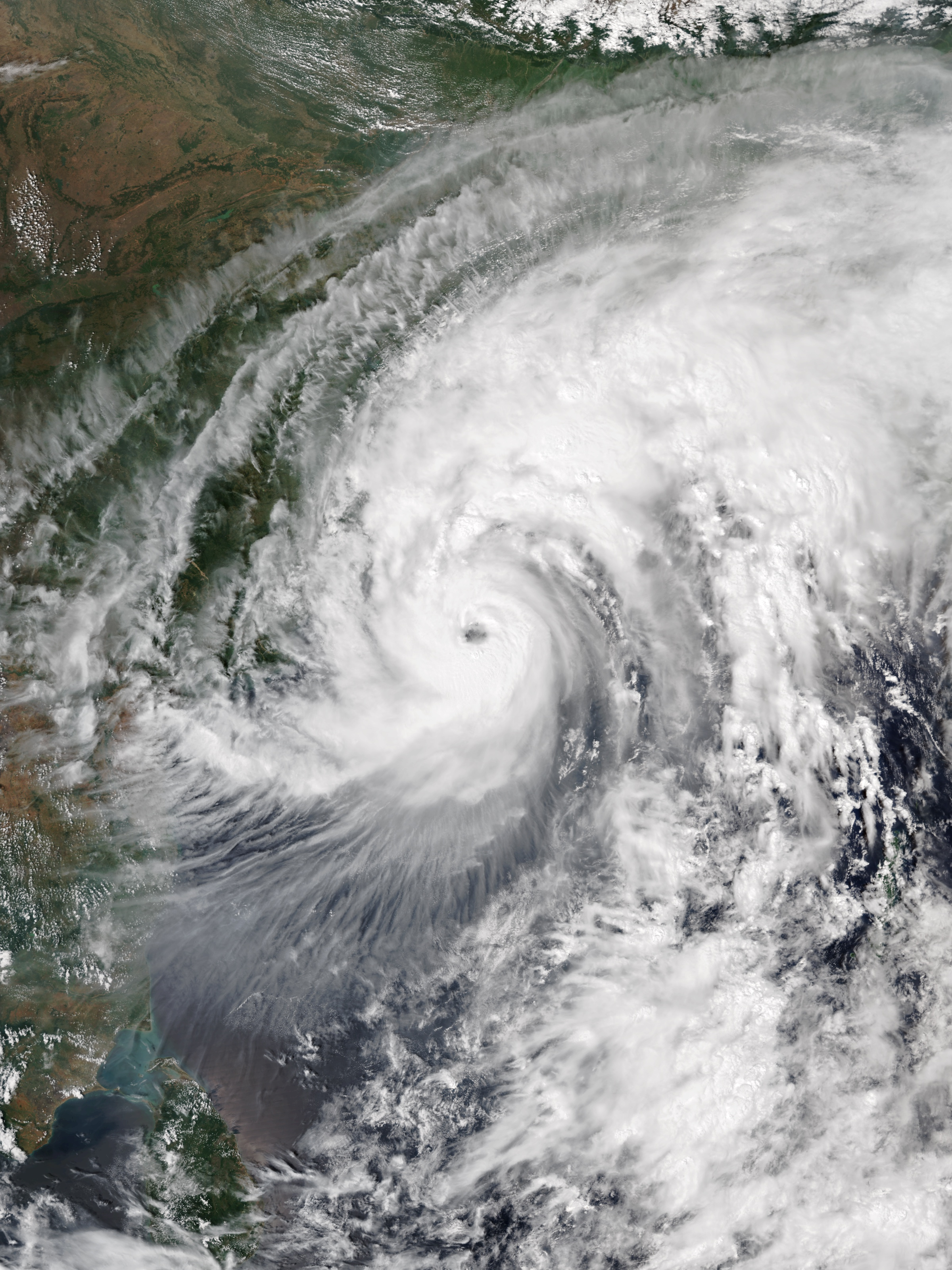
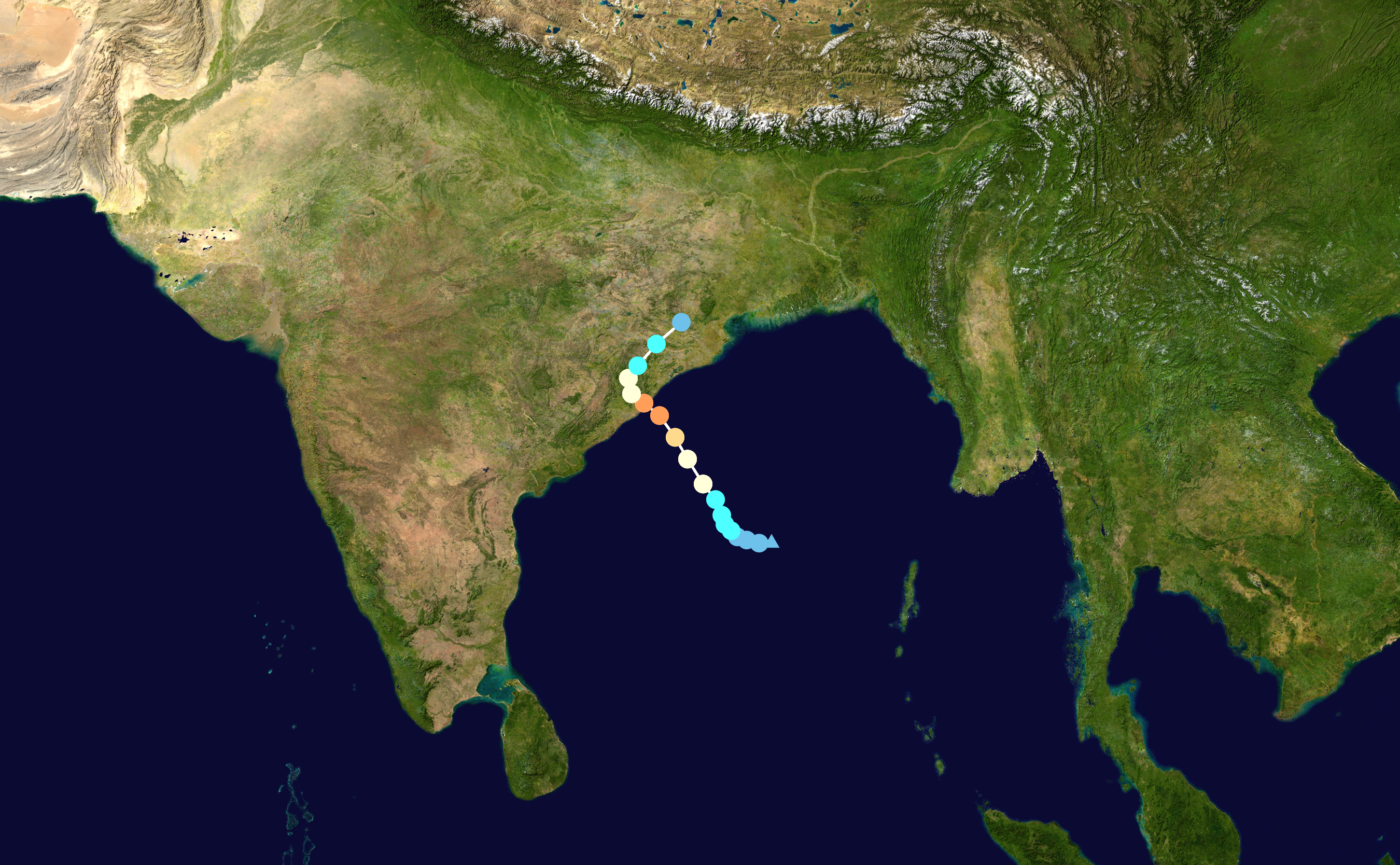
- Duration: October 8 – October 12
- Peak intensity: 150 km/h (90 mph) (3-min); 972 hPa (mbar)

On October 6, a low-pressure area formed in the Andaman Sea. Over the next two days, the disaster entered the Bay of Bengal and became a depression on October 8, receiving the designation BOB 08 from the IMD. Afterward, the storm rapidly strengthened, becoming Very Severe Cyclonic Storm Titli (Note: The name Titli (Urdu: تتلی, [t̪ɪt̪liː]) was contributed by Pakistan and means "butterfly" in Urdu.) on October 9, with the strength of a Category 3 major hurricane on the Saffir–Simpson scale (SSHWS).

Between 4:30 a.m. and 5:30 a.m. IST on October 11 (23:00–00:00 UTC on October 10–11), Titli made landfall near Palasa, Andhra Pradesh, at peak intensity.

Titli killed at least 77 people in Odisha and left a couple of others missing, due to heavy flooding and landslides, and caused another 8 deaths in Andhra Pradesh. The storm weakened into a depression before entering West Bengal, wreaking havoc in some parts of South Bengal, and bringing torrential rain and gale-force wind. Damage from flooding caused by Titli totaled at ₹3,673.1 crore (US$507 million) in Andhra Pradesh, and ₹3,000 crore (US$413 million) in Odisha. The storm also caused serious damage to the East Coast railway. Titli also killed four people in Bangladesh due to landslides.

=== Very Severe Cyclonic Storm Gaja ===
- Very severe cyclonic storm (IMD)
- Category 1 tropical cyclone (SSHWS)
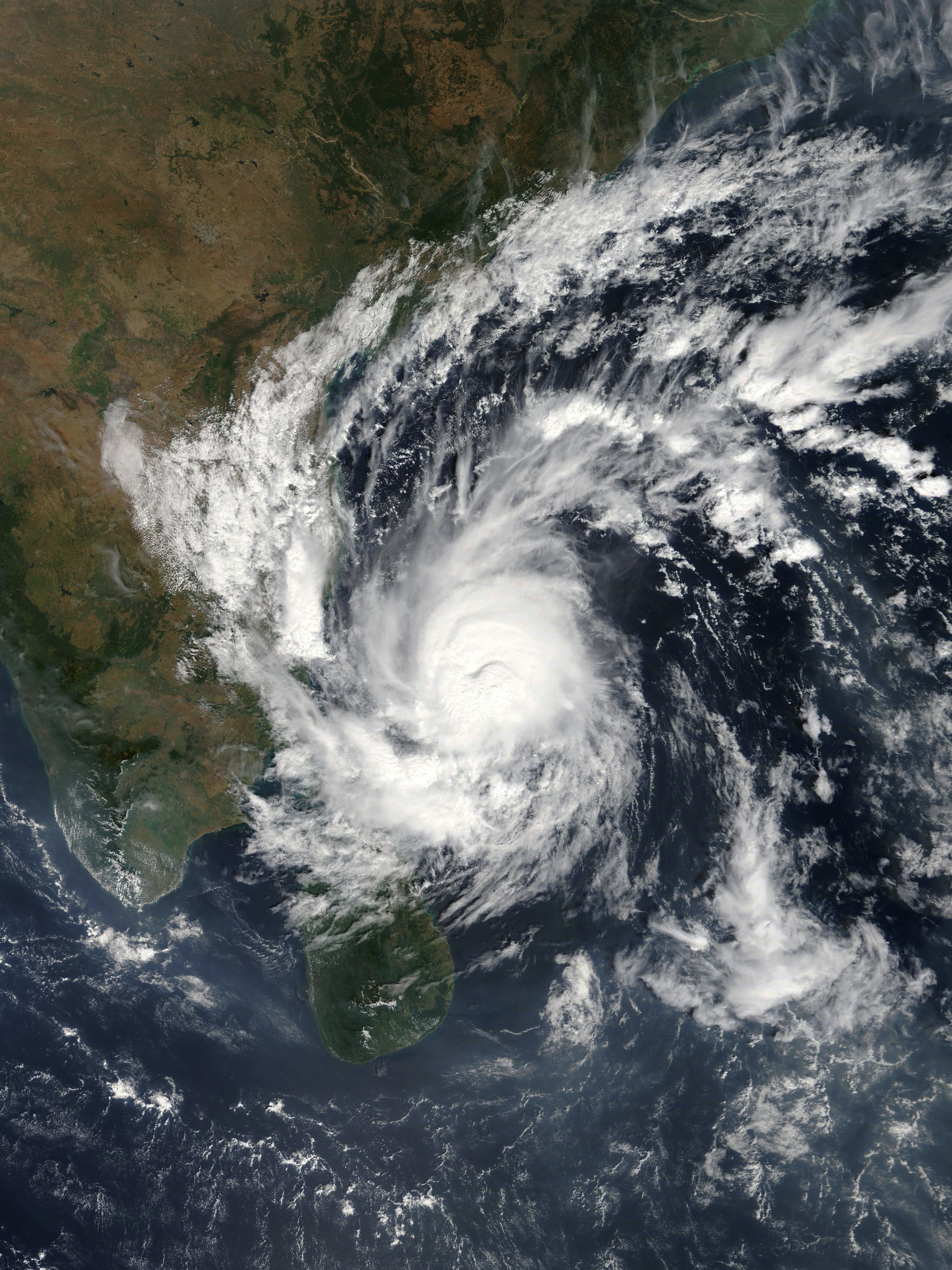
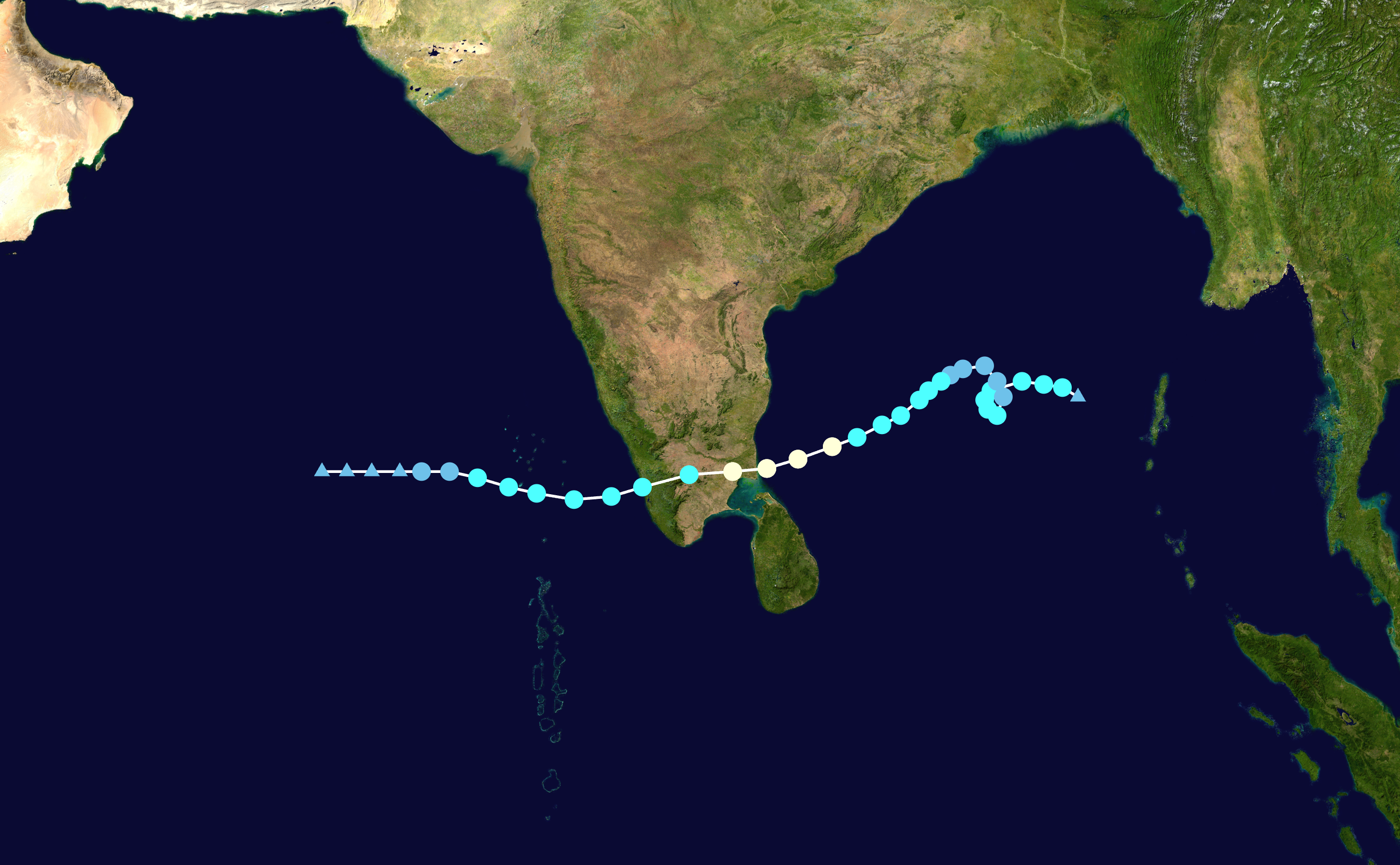
- Duration: November 10 – November 19
- Peak intensity: 130 km/h (80 mph) (3-min); 976 hPa (mbar)

On November 5, a low-pressure system formed over the Gulf of Thailand. The system crossed through Southern Thailand and the Malay Peninsula on November 8. On the next day, it crossed into the Andaman Sea and lingered there, organizing further throughout the day, before intensifying into a depression over the Bay of Bengal on November 10, with the IMD designating the system as Depression BOB 09. Soon afterward, the Joint Typhoon Warning Center (JTWC) issued a Tropical Cyclone Formation Alert (TCFA) on the system. At 00:00 UTC on November 11, the deep depression strengthened into a cyclonic storm, and was named Gaja. (Note: The name Gaja (Sinhala: ගජ, [gadʒa]) was contributed by Sri Lanka and means "elephant" in Sinhala.) After tracking west-southwestward for a number of days, it made landfall in Tamil Nadu, on November 16. The storm survived crossing over into the Arabian Sea later that day; however, it degenerated into a remnant low in hostile conditions only several days later, on November 20. On the next day, the storm's remnants dissipated near Socotra.

In India, 52 people were killed by the storm. Damage nationwide was about ₹5,400 crore (US$775 million).

=== Severe Cyclonic Storm Phethai ===
- Severe cyclonic storm (IMD)
- Tropical storm (SSHWS)
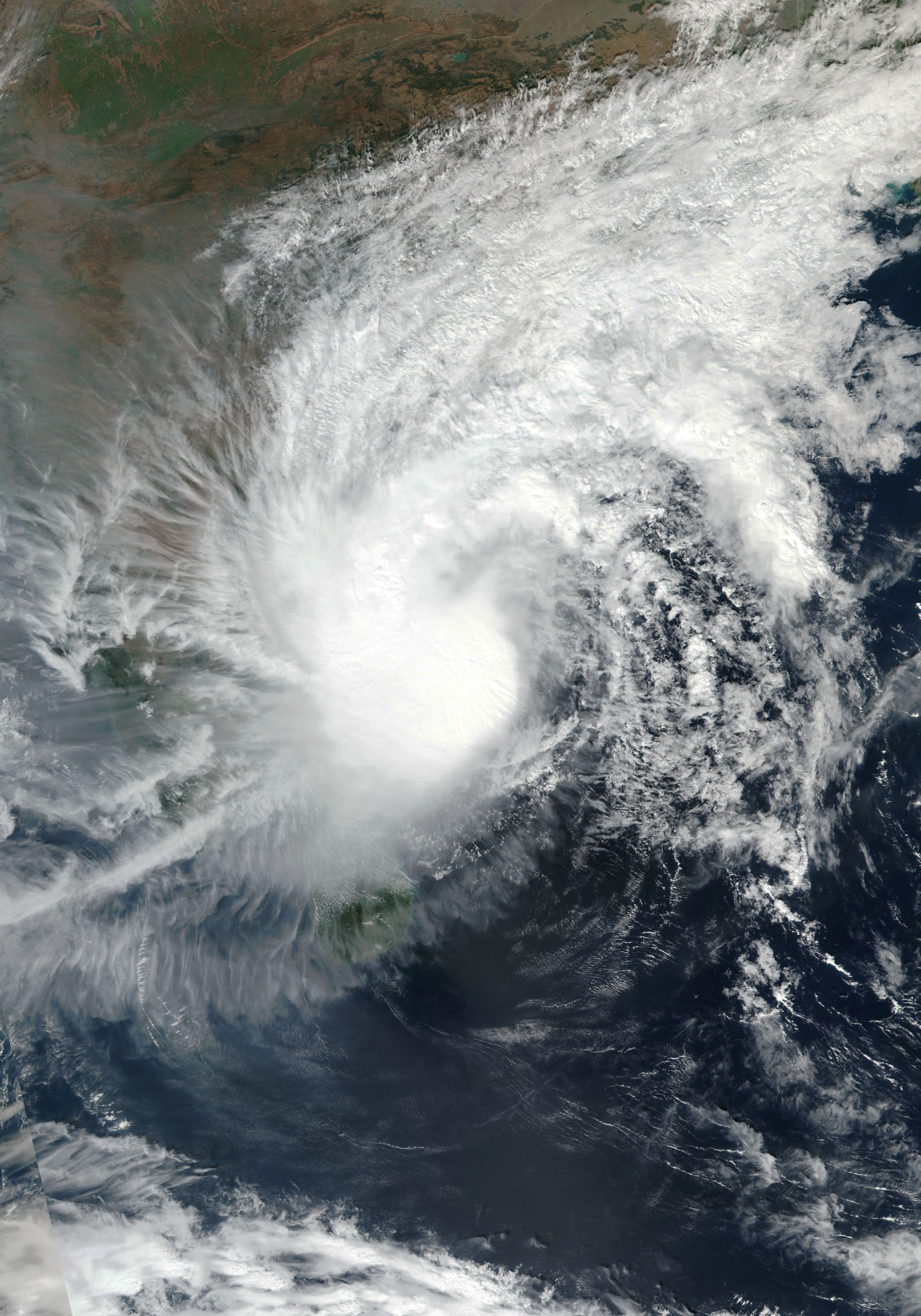
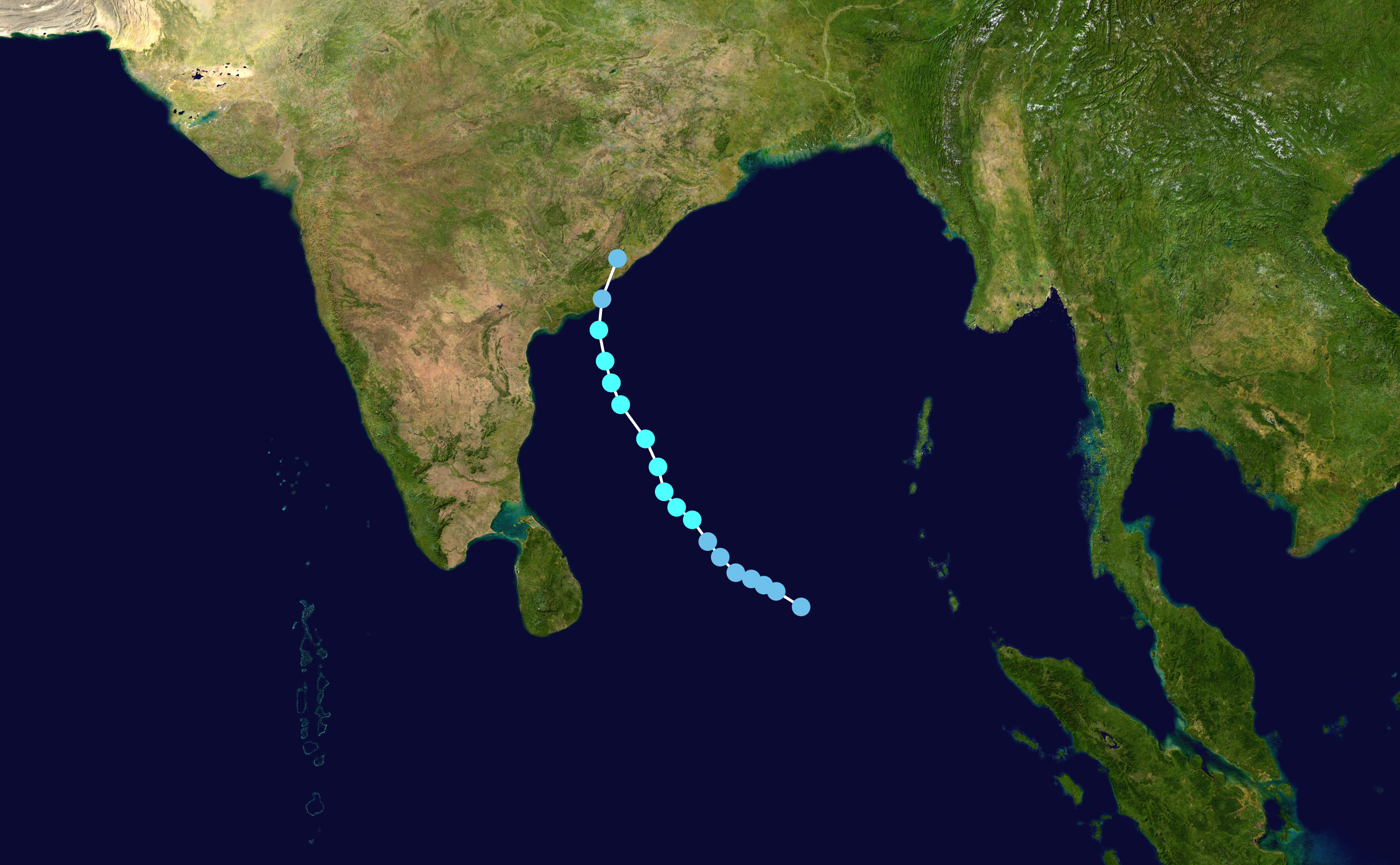
- Duration: December 13 – December 17
- Peak intensity: 100 km/h (65 mph) (3-min); 992 hPa (mbar)

An area of convection developed in the southern Bay of Bengal on December 13. The disturbance was forecasted having little chance to develop; however, the storm's convection persisted and organized, resulting in the storm being classified as Depression BOB 10. The depression gradually organized and intensified into a deep depression on December 14. Within 24 hours, the deep depression attained 3-minute sustained winds of 40 mph, and the storm was named Phethai. (Note: The name Phethai (Thai: เพทาย, [pʰeː˧ tʰaːj˧]) was contributed by Thailand and means "zircon" in Thai.) Phethai steadily strengthened and on December 16, Phethai peaked with 65 mph winds and at severe cyclonic storm status. The storm steadily weakened and made landfall at Katrenikona on December 17, with 3-minute sustained winds of 50 mph. Phethai rapidly weakened as it traversed Andhra Pradesh, and finally dissipated over a tropical rainforest south west of Kolkata.

Eight people were reported dead after Phethai, and the agricultural damage in Andhra Pradesh was estimated at ₹294.54 crore (US$41.1 million).

== Storm names ==
Within this basin, a tropical cyclone is assigned a name when it is judged to have reached Cyclonic Storm intensity, with winds of 65 km/h (40 mph). The names were selected by members of the ESCAP/WMO panel on Tropical Cyclones between 2000 and May 2004, before the Regional Specialized Meteorological Center in New Delhi started to assign names in September 2004. There is no retirement of tropical cyclone names in this basin, as the list of names is only scheduled to be used once before a new list of names is drawn up. Should a named tropical cyclone move into the basin from the Western Pacific, then it will retain its original name. The next eight available names from the List of North Indian Ocean storm names are below.

- Sagar
- Mekunu
- Daye
- Luban
- Titli
- Gaja
- Phethai

== Season effects ==
This is a table of all storms in the 2018 North Indian Ocean cyclone season. It mentions all of the season's storms and their names, duration, peak intensities (according to the IMD storm scale), damage, and death totals. Damage and death totals include the damage and deaths caused when that storm was a precursor wave or extratropical low, and all of the damage figures are in 2018 USD.

Name	Dates	Peak intensity			Areas affected	Damage (USD)	Deaths	Ref(s).
Name	Dates	Category	Wind speed	Pressure	Areas affected	Damage (USD)	Deaths	Ref(s).
ARB 01	March 13–14	Depression	45 km/h (30 mph)	1,006 hPa (29.71 inHg)	South India, Maldives	None	None	
Sagar	May 16–20	Cyclonic storm	85 km/h (55 mph)	994 hPa (29.35 inHg)	Yemen, Horn of Africa	$30 million	79	
Mekunu	May 21–27	Extremely severe cyclonic storm	175 km/h (110 mph)	960 hPa (28.35 inHg)	Yemen, Oman, Saudi Arabia	$1.5 billion	31	
BOB 01	May 29–30	Deep depression	55 km/h (35 mph)	992 hPa (29.29 inHg)	Myanmar, Bangladesh	None	5	
LAND 01	June 10–10	Depression	45 km/h (30 mph)	988 hPa (29.18 inHg)	Bangladesh	None	None	
LAND 02	July 21–23	Depression	45 km/h (30 mph)	988 hPa (29.18 inHg)	East India, North India	Unknown	5	
LAND 03	August 7–8	Depression	45 km/h (30 mph)	992 hPa (29.29 inHg)	East India	None	None	
LAND 04	August 15–17	Depression	45 km/h (30 mph)	993 hPa (29.32 inHg)	East India, Central India, West India	Unknown	None	
LAND 05	September 6–7	Deep depression	55 km/h (35 mph)	990 hPa (29.23 inHg)	East India	Unknown	None	
Daye	September 19–22	Cyclonic storm	65 km/h (40 mph)	992 hPa (29.29 inHg)	Andhra Pradesh, East India, Central India, North India	Minimal	None	
Luban	October 6–15	Very severe cyclonic storm	140 km/h (85 mph)	978 hPa (28.88 inHg)	Yemen, Oman	$1 billion	14	
Titli	October 8–12	Very severe cyclonic storm	150 km/h (95 mph)	972 hPa (28.70 inHg)	Andhra Pradesh, Odisha, West Bengal, Bangladesh	$920 million	89	
Gaja	November 10–19	Very severe cyclonic storm	130 km/h (80 mph)	976 hPa (28.82 inHg)	Andaman Islands, Tamil Nadu (India), Sri Lanka	$775 million	52	
Phethai	December 13–17	Severe cyclonic storm	100 km/h (60 mph)	992 hPa (29.29 inHg)	East India, Northeast India	$100 million	8	
Season aggregates
14 systems	March 13 – December 17		175 km/h (110 mph)	960 hPa (28.35 inHg)		$4.33 billion	283	

== See also ==
- Weather of 2018
- Tropical cyclones in 2018
- 2018 Atlantic hurricane season
- 2018 Pacific hurricane season
- 2018 Pacific typhoon season
- South-West Indian Ocean cyclone seasons: 2017–18, 2018–19
- Australian region cyclone seasons: 2017–18, 2018–19
- South Pacific cyclone seasons: 2017–18, 2018–19
