= List of highways numbered 566 =

The following highways are numbered 566:

== United States ==
- US 566 (former)
- SR 566
- LA 566
- MD 566
- PA 566
- PR-566 (former)
- FM 566

Preceded by 565	Lists of highways 566	Succeeded by 567
