= Chennuru, Khammam district =

Chennuru
- Village
- Location within Telangana Location within India
- Coordinates: 17°7′27.71″N 80°29′42.23″E
- Country: India Kallur
- State: Telangana
- District: Khammam
- Mandal: Kalluru

Government
  - Type: Panchayathi Raj
  - Body: Grama panchayathi

Population (Census 2011)
  - Total: 3,416

Languages
  - Official: Telugu
- Time zone: UTC+5:30 (IST)
- PIN: 507 209
- Telephone code: +91-8761-XX XXXX

Chennuru is a village in Kalluru Mandal in Khammam District of Telangana State. Chennuru is a large village located in Kallur Mandal of Khammam district, Telangana with total 1004 families residing. The Chennuru village has population of, 3416 of which 1693 are males while 1723 are females as per Population Census 2011. In Chennuru village, population of children with age 0-6 is 337 which makes up 9.87 % of total population of village. Average Sex Ratio of Chennuru village is 1018 which is higher than Andhra Pradesh state average of 993. Child Sex Ratio for the Chennuru as per census is 994, higher than Andhra Pradesh average of 939.

In Chennuru village out of total population, 1942 were engaged in work activities. 47.43 % of workers describe their work as Main Work (Employment or Earning more than 6 Months) while 52.57 % were involved in Marginal activity providing livelihood for less than 6 months. Of 1942 workers engaged in Main Work, 69 were cultivators (owner or co-owner) while 660 were Agricultural labourer.
