= List of highways numbered 563 =

The following highways are numbered 563:

== Canada ==
- Alberta Highway 563
- Highway 563 (Ontario)

== Ireland ==
- R563 regional road

== United States ==
- CR 563
- PA 563
- PR-563

Preceded by 562	Lists of highways 563	Succeeded by 564
