= Timeline of the 2018 North Indian Ocean cyclone season =

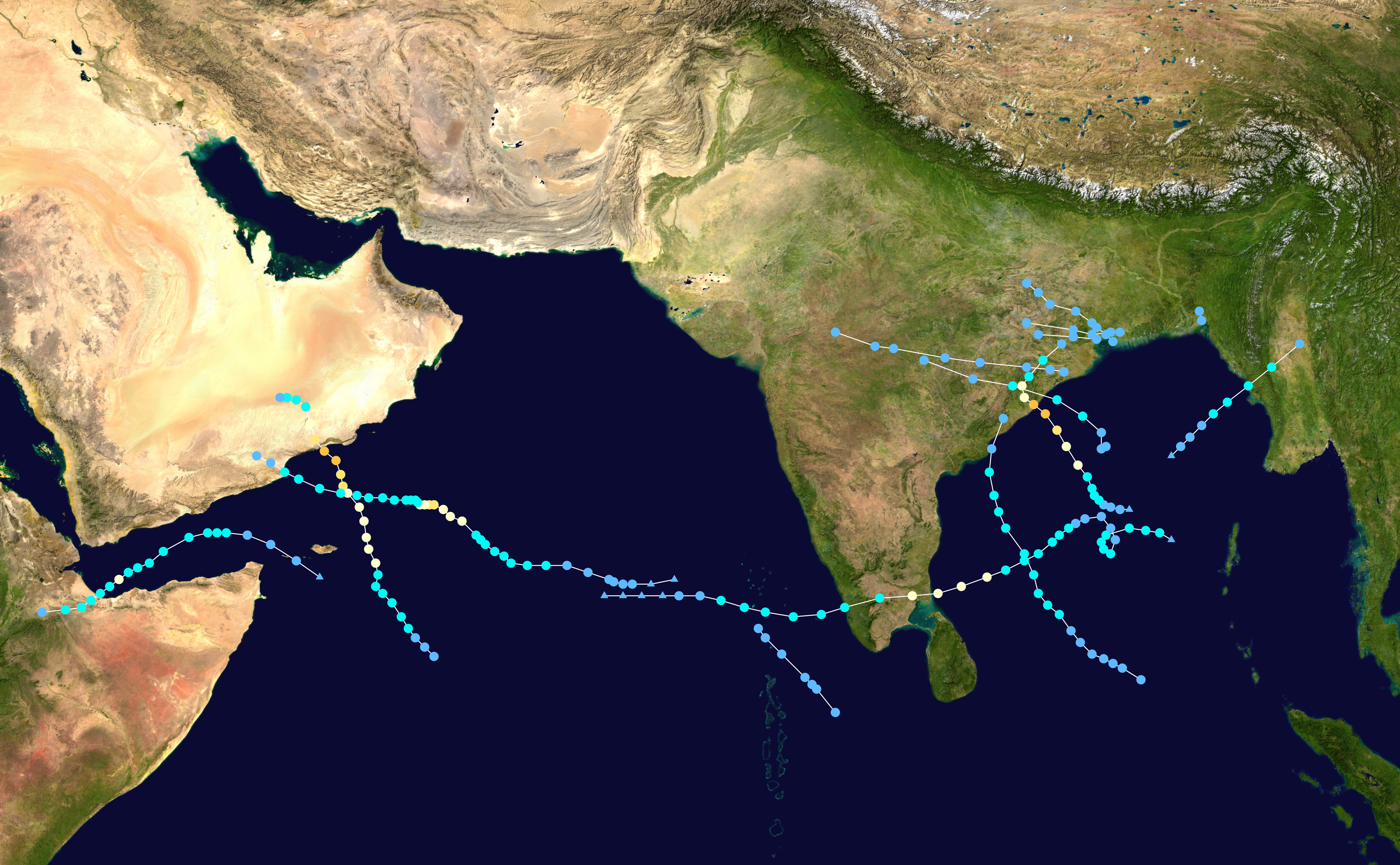
- Season summary map

Season boundaries
- First system formed: March 13, 2018
- Last system dissipated: December 17, 2018

Strongest system
- Name: Mekunu
- Maximum winds: 175 km/h (110 mph) (3-minute sustained)
- Lowest pressure: 960 hPa (mbar)

Longest lasting system
- Name: Gaja
- Duration: 9.625 days
Storm articles
- Cyclone Sagar
- Cyclone Mekunu
- Cyclone Luban
- Cyclone Titli
- Cyclone Gaja
- Cyclone Phethai

The 2018 North Indian Ocean cyclone season was an above-average period of tropical cyclone formation in the Northern Indian Ocean. The season featured 14 depressions, 10 deep depressions, 7 cyclonic storms, 5 severe cyclonic storms, 4 very severe cyclonic storms, and 1 extremely severe cyclonic storm. The season has no official boundaries, though storms typically form between April and December, with peaks in tropical cyclone activity from May–June and in November.

This timeline documents tropical cyclone formations, strengthening, weakening, landfalls, extratropical transitions, and dissipations during the season. The time stamp for each event is stated using Coordinated Universal Time (UTC), the 24-hour clock where 00:00 = midnight UTC. Additionally, figures for maximum sustained winds and position estimates are rounded to the nearest 5 units (Kilometres or miles). Direct wind observations are rounded to the nearest whole number. Meteorological observations typically report atmospheric pressures are measured in hectopascals per the recommendation of the World Meteorological Organization, and the nearest hundredth of an inches of mercury or millibars (hectopascals).

The India Meteorological Department (IMD) is the official Regional Specialized Meteorological Centre for the Northern Indian Ocean basin, and as such, it is responsible for tracking and issuing advisories on systems in the Arabian Sea and in the Bay of Bengal. If tropical cyclones in the Northern Indian Ocean reach winds of 34 kn (63 km/h; 39 mph), it is given a name from a pre-defined naming list. The Joint Typhoon Warning Center (JTWC) unofficially issues advisories on systems in the Northern Indian Ocean, assigning tropical cyclones a numerical identifier and suffixing it with the letter A for systems in the Arabian Sea and B for systems in the Bay of Bengal. The IMD measures tropical cyclone wind speeds over a 3-minute average while the JTWC uses a 1-minute average.

== Timeline ==
=== March ===
March 13

- 03:00 UTC at 5.0°N 76.0°E – the IMD upgrades a well-marked low-pressure area in the Arabian Sea to a depression, estimating maximum 3-minute sustained winds of 45 km/h (30 mph) and a minimum central pressure of 1006 hPa (mbar; 29.71 inHg).

March 15

- 00:00 UTC – the IMD downgrades the depression to a well-marked low over Lakshadweep.

=== May ===
May 16

- 00:00 UTC at 12.0°N 52.7°E – the JTWC upgrades a disturbance to a tropical depression, assigning it the designation 01A.
- 12:00 UTC at 13.0°N 50.0°E – the IMD upgrades 01A to a depression.
- 18:00 UTC at 13.2°N 49.7°E – the JTWC upgrades 01A to a tropical storm.

May 17

- 00:00 UTC at 13.2°N 49.0°E – the IMD upgrades 01A to a deep depression.
- 03:00 UTC at 13.2°N 48.7°E – the IMD upgrades 01A to a cyclonic storm, assigning it the name Sagar.

May 18

- 03:00 UTC at 12.2°N 46.3°E – the IMD estimates Sagar to have peaked in intensity with maximum 3-minute sustained winds of 85 km/h (50 mph) and a minimum central pressure of 994 hPa (mbar; 29.35 inHg).
- 18:00 UTC at 11.2°N 45.1°E – the JTWC upgrades Sagar to a Category 1-equivalent cyclone on the Saffir–Simpson scale, estimating maximum 1-minute sustained winds of 120 km/h (75 mph).

May 19

- 00:00 UTC at 10.9°N 44.7°E – the JTWC downgrades Sagar to a tropical storm.
- between 08:00 and 09:00 UTC at 10.65°N 44.0°E – Sagar makes landfall on Somalia.
- 18:00 UTC at 10.2°N 43.3°E – the IMD downgrades Sagar to a deep depression.

May 20

- 00:00 UTC at 10.0°N 42.9°E – the IMD downgrades Sagar to a depression.
- 03:00 UTC – the IMD downgrades Sagar to a well-marked low.
- 06:00 UTC at 9.8°N 41.8°E – the JTWC downgrades Sagar to a tropical depression.

May 21

- 06:00 UTC at 7.9°N 58.6°E – the JTWC begins monitoring a tropical depression in the Arabian Sea, assigning it the designation 02A.
- 12:00 UTC at 8.5°N 58.5°E – the IMD upgrades 02A to a depression.

May 22

- 00:00 UTC at 9.1°N 57.5°E – the JTWC upgrades 02A to a tropical storm.
- 03:00 UTC at 9.2°N 57.2°E – the IMD upgrades 02A to a deep depression.
- 12:00 UTC at 9.2°N 57.2°E – the IMD upgrades 02A to a cyclonic storm, assigning it the name Mekunu.

May 23

- 03:00 UTC at 11.2°N 55.9°E – the IMD upgrades Mekunu to a severe cyclonic storm.
- 09:00 UTC at 11.8°N 55.9°E – the IMD upgrades Mekunu to a very severe cyclonic storm.
- 12:00 UTC at 11.9°N 56.1°E – the JTWC upgrades Mekunu to a Category 1-equivalent cyclone on the Saffir–Simpson scale.

May 25

- 00:00 UTC at 15.2°N 54.7°E – the JTWC upgrades Mekunu to a Category 2-equivalent cyclone on the Saffir–Simpson scale.
- 03:00 UTC at 15.4°N 54.5°E – the IMD upgrades Mekunu to an extremely severe cyclonic storm.
- 12:00 UTC at 16.4°N 54.1°E – the IMD estimates Mekunu to have peaked in intensity with maximum 3-minute sustained winds of 175 km/h (110 mph) and a minimum central pressure of 960 hPa (mbar; 28.35 inHg).
- 12:00 UTC at 16.3°N 54.4°E – the JTWC upgrades Mekunu to a Category 3-equivalent cyclone on the Saffir–Simpson scale, estimating maximum 1-minute sustained winds of 185 km/h (115 mph).
- between 18:30 and 19:30 UTC at 16.85°N 53.75°E – Mekunu makes landfall on Oman.

May 26

- 00:00 UTC at 17.2°N 53.5°E – the IMD downgrades Mekunu to a very severe cyclonic storm.
- 00:00 UTC at 17.2°N 53.5°E – the JTWC downgrades Mekunu to a Category 2-equivalent cyclone on the Saffir–Simpson scale.
- 03:00 UTC at 17.4°N 53.4°E – the IMD downgrades Mekunu to a severe cyclonic storm.
- 06:00 UTC at 17.9°N 53.3°E – the JTWC downgrades Mekunu to a Category 1-equivalent cyclone on the Saffir–Simpson scale.
- 09:00 UTC at 18.1°N 53.1°E – the IMD downgrades Mekunu to a cyclonic storm.
- 12:00 UTC at 18.6°N 53.1°E – the JTWC downgrades Mekunu to a tropical storm.
- 18:00 UTC at 18.6°N 52.8°E – the IMD downgrades Mekunu to a deep depression.

May 27

- 00:00 UTC at 19.0°N 52.6°E – the IMD downgrades Mekunu to a depression.
- 03:00 UTC – the IMD downgrades Mekunu to a well-marked low.
- 06:00 UTC at 19.0°N 52.0°E – the JTWC downgrades Mekunu to a tropical depression.

May 28

- 06:00 UTC at 16.5°N 90.2°E – the JTWC upgrades a disturbance in the Bay of Bengal to a tropical depression, assigning it the designation 03B.
- 18:00 UTC at 17.8°N 91.5°E – the JTWC downgrades 03B to a tropical wave.

May 29

- 00:00 UTC at 18.3°N 92.0°E – the JTWC upgrades 03B to a tropical storm.
- 06:00 UTC at 18.5°N 92.2°E – the IMD upgrades 03B to a depression.
- 12:00 UTC at 19.2°N 93.0°E – the IMD estimates 03B to have peaked in intensity with maximum 3-minute sustained winds of 55 km/h (35 mph) and a minimum central pressure of 992 hPa (mbar; 29.29 inHg).
- 12:00 UTC at 19.5°N 93.5°E – the JTWC estimates 03B to have peaked in intensity with maximum 1-minute sustained winds of 85 km/h (50 mph).
- between 17:00 and 18:00 UTC – 03B makes landfall north of Kyaukphyu.
- 18:00 UTC at 19.8°N 93.7°E – the IMD upgrades 03B to a deep depression.

May 30

- 00:00 UTC at 21.3°N 95.7°E – the JTWC downgrades 03B to a tropical depression.
- 03:00 UTC at 21.8°N 95.8°E – the IMD downgrades 03B to a depression.
- 06:00 UTC – the IMD downgrades 03B to a well-marked low.

=== June ===
June 10

- 06:00 UTC at 22.3°N 91.5°E – the IMD upgrades a well-marked low in the Bay of Bengal to a depression.
- 12:00 UTC at 22.7°N 91.4°E – the IMD estimates the depression to have peaked in intensity with maximum 3-minute sustained winds of 45 km/h (30 mph) and a minimum central pressure of 988 hPa (mbar; 29.18 inHg).
- 15:00 UTC at 23.1°N 91.2°E – the depression makes landfall on Feni.

June 11

- 00:00 UTC – the IMD downgrades the depression to a well-marked low.

=== July ===
July 21

- 03:00 UTC at 21.0°N 88.0°E – the IMD upgrades a well-marked low in the Bay of Bengal to a depression.
- 09:00 UTC at 21.5°N 87.6°E – the IMD upgrades the system to a deep depression, estimating maximum 3-minute sustained winds of 55 km/h (35 mph) and a minimum central pressure of 988 hPa (mbar; 29.18 inHg).
- between 11:00 and 12:00 UTC – the system makes landfall south of Digha.
- 18:00 UTC at 22.0°N 87.0°E – the IMD downgrades the system to a depression.

July 23

- 00:00 UTC – the IMD downgrades the system to a well-marked low.

=== August ===
August 7

- 09:00 UTC at 21.5°N 87.5°E – the IMD upgrades a well-marked low in the Bay of Bengal to a depression, estimating maximum 3-minute sustained winds of 45 km/h (30 mph) and a minimum central pressure of 992 Hpa (mbar; 29.29 inHg).
- between 14:30 and 16:30 UTC – the depression makes landfall close to Balasore.

August 8

- 03:00 UTC – the IMD downgrades the depression to a well-marked low.

August 15

- 03:00 UTC at 20.0°N 86.0°E – the IMD upgrades a well-marked low in the Bay of Bengal to a depression, estimating maximum sustained 3-minute winds of 45 km/h (30 mph) and a minimum central pressure of 993 Hpa (mbar; 29.32 inHg).

August 17

- 03:00 UTC – the IMD downgrades the depression to a well-marked low.

=== September ===
September 6

- 00:00 UTC at 21.8°N 88.0°E – the IMD upgrades a well-marked low in the Bay of Bengal to a depression.
- 03:00 UTC at 21.8°N 87.9°E – the IMD upgrades the system to a deep depression, estimating maximum 3-minute sustained winds of 55 km/h (35 mph).
- between 04:30 and 05:30 UTC – the system makes landfall close to Digha.

September 7

- 00:00 UTC at 22.2°N 84.0°E – the IMD downgrades the system to a depression.
- 06:00 UTC – the IMD downgrades the system to a well-marked low.

September 19

- 15:00 UTC at 17.2°N 89.0°E – the IMD upgrades a well-marked low in the Bay of Bengal to a depression.
- 18:00 UTC at 16.9°N 87.4°E – the JTWC upgrades the system to a tropical depression, assigning it the designation 04B and estimating maximum 1-minute sustained winds of 65 km/h (40 mph).

September 20

- 03:00 UTC at 17.5°N 87.0°E – the IMD upgrades 04B to a deep depression.
- 12:00 UTC at 18.2°N 86.4°E – the JTWC upgrades 04B to a tropical storm.
- 15:00 UTC at 18.7°N 85.6°E – the IMD upgrades 04B to a cyclonic storm, assigning it the name Daye and estimating maximum 3-minute sustained winds of 65 km/h (40 mph) and a minimum central pressure of 992 Hpa (mbar; 29.29 inHg).
- between 19:00 and 20:00 UTC at 19.27°N 84.92°E – Daye makes landfall on Gopalpur.

September 21

- 00:00 UTC at 20.0°N 83.7°E – the IMD downgrades Daye to a deep depression.
- 06:00 UTC at 19.8°N 81.7°E – the JTWC downgrades Daye to a tropical depression.
- 12:00 UTC at 21.4°N 80.2°E – the IMD downgrades Daye to a depression.

September 22

- 12:00 UTC – the IMD downgrades Daye to a well-marked low.

=== October ===
October 6

- 06:00 UTC at 11.0°N 67.1°E – the JTWC upgrades a disturbance in the Arabian Sea to a tropical depression, assigning it the designation 04A.
- 09:00 UTC at 11.2°N 67.0°E – the IMD upgrades 05A to a depression.

October 7

- 09:00 UTC at 12.0°N 64.8°E – the IMD upgrades 05A to a deep depression.
- 18:00 UTC at 11.8°N 63.4°E – the JTWC upgrades 05A to a tropical storm.

October 8

- 00:00 UTC at 12.3°N 62.4°E – the IMD upgrades 05A to a cyclonic storm, assigning it the name Luban.
- 03:00 UTC at 14.0°N 88.8°E – the IMD upgrades a well-marked low in the Bay of Bengal to a depression.
- 06:00 UTC at 14.2°N 88.0°E – the JTWC upgrades the system to a tropical depression, assigning it the designation 06B.
- 18:00 UTC at 14.5°N 87.6°E – the IMD upgrades 06B to a deep depression.

October 9

- 00:00 UTC at 14.6°N 87.1°E – the JTWC upgrades 06B to a tropical storm.
- 06:00 UTC at 14.8°N 86.7°E – the IMD upgrades 06B to a cyclonic storm, assigning it the name Titli.
- 09:00 UTC at 13.2°N 60.0°E – the IMD upgrades Luban to a severe cyclonic storm.
- 18:00 UTC at 13.7°N 59.8°E – the JTWC upgrades Luban to a Category 1-equivalent cyclone on the Saffir–Simpson scale.
- 21:00 UTC at 15.7°N 85.8°E – the IMD upgrades Titli to a severe cyclonic storm.

October 10

- 00:00 UTC at 14.1°N 59.0°E – the IMD upgrades Luban to a very severe cyclonic storm.
- 00:00 UTC at 16.1°N 86.2°E – the JTWC upgrades Titli to a Category 1-equivalent cyclone on the Saffir–Simpson scale.
- 06:00 UTC at 14.2°N 58.9°E – the IMD estimates Luban to have peaked in intensity with maximum 3-minute sustained winds of 140 km/h (85 mph) and a minimum central pressure of 978 hPa (mbar; 28.88 inHg).
- 06:00 UTC at 17.0°N 85.6°E – the IMD upgrades Titli to a very severe cyclonic storm.
- 12:00 UTC at 14.4°N 58.6°E – the JTWC upgrades Luban to a Category 2-equivalent cyclone on the Saffir–Simpson scale, estimating maximum 1-minute sustained winds of 155 km/h (100 mph).
- 12:00 UTC at 17.5°N 85.3°E – the IMD estimates Titli to have peaked in intensity with maximum 3-minute sustained winds of 150 km/h (90 mph) and a minimum central pressure of 970 hPa (mbar; 28.64 inHg).
- 12:00 UTC at 17.6°N 85.3°E – the JTWC upgrades Titli to a Category 2-equivalent cyclone on the Saffir–Simpson scale.
- 18:00 UTC at 18.3°N 84.8°E – the JTWC upgrades Titli to a Category 3-equivalent cyclone on the Saffir–Simpson scale, estimating maximum 1-minute sustained winds of 195 km/h (120 mph).
- between 23:00 UTC and 00:00 UTC October 11 at 18.8°N 84.5°E – Titli makes landfall on Andhra Pradesh.

October 11

- 00:00 UTC at 14.4°N 58.2°E – the JTWC downgrades Luban to a Category 1-equivalent cyclone on the Saffir–Simpson scale.
- 06:00 UTC at 19.3°N 83.8°E – the IMD downgrades Titli to a severe cyclonic storm.
- 06:00 UTC at 19.0°N 83.9°E – the JTWC downgrades Titli to a Category 1-equivalent cyclone on the Saffir–Simpson scale.
- 12:00 UTC at 14.5°N 57.9°E – the JTWC downgrades Luban to a tropical storm.
- 12:00 UTC at 19.9°N 83.7°E – the IMD downgrades Titli to a cyclonic storm.
- 18:00 UTC at 20.3°N 84.3°E – the IMD downgrades Titli to a deep depression.
- 18:00 UTC at 19.9°N 84.1°E – the JTWC downgrades Titli to a tropical storm.

October 12

- 03:00 UTC at 14.7°N 57.4°E – the IMD downgrades Luban to a severe cyclonic storm.
- 06:00 UTC at 21.3°N 85.5°E – the JTWC downgrades Titli to a tropical depression.
- 09:00 UTC at 20.9°N 85.5°E – the IMD downgrades Titli to a depression.
- 18:00 UTC at 14.8°N 56.6°E – the IMD downgrades Luban to a cyclonic storm.

October 13

- 00:00 UTC at 20.9°N 85.5°E – the IMD downgrades Titli to a well-marked low.

October 14

- between 05:30 and 06:00 UTC at 15.8°N 52.2°E – Luban makes landfall on Oman.
- 09:00 UTC at 15.9°N 51.7°E – the IMD downgrades Luban to a deep depression.
- 12:00 UTC at 16.2°N 51.6°E – the JTWC downgrades Luban to a tropical depression.
- 18:00 UTC at 16.2°N 50.7°E – the IMD downgrades Luban to a depression.

October 15

- 03:00 UTC – the IMD downgrades Luban to a well-marked low.

=== November ===
November 10

- 03:00 UTC at 11.7°N 92.5°E – the IMD upgrades a well-marked low in the Bay of Bengal to a depression.
- 12:00 UTC at 12.6°N 90.8°E – the IMD upgrades the system to a deep depression.
- 18:00 UTC at 13.2°N 89.7°E – the JTWC upgrades the system to a tropical storm, assigning it the designation 07B.

November 11

- 00:00 UTC at 13.4°N 89.3°E – the IMD upgrades 07B to a cyclonic storm, assigning it the name Gaja.

November 12

- 12:00 UTC at 12.9°N 87.8°E – the JTWC downgrades Gaja to a tropical depression.

November 13

- 18:00 UTC at 13.4°N 85.8°E – the JTWC upgrades Gaja to a tropical storm.

November 15

- 03:00 UTC at 11.3°N 82.6°E – the IMD upgrades Gaja to a severe cyclonic storm.
- 06:00 UTC at 11.3°N 82.3°E – the JTWC upgrades Gaja to a Category 1-equivalent cyclone on the Saffir–Simpson scale.
- 15:00 UTC at 10.6°N 80.7°E – the IMD upgrades Gaja to a very severe cyclonic storm.
- 18:00 UTC at 10.5°N 80.3°E – the IMD estimates Gaja to have peaked in intensity with maximum 3-minute sustained winds of 130 km/h (80 mph) and a minimum central pressure of 976 hPa (mbar; 28.82 inHg).
- 18:00 UTC at 10.6°N 80.2°E – the JTWC estimates Gaja to have peaked in intensity with maximum 1-minute sustained winds of 150 km/h (90 mph).
- between 19:00 and 21:00 UTC at 10.45°N 79.8°E – Gaja makes landfall between Nagapattinam and Vedaranyam.

November 16

- 00:00 UTC at 10.4°N 79.2°E – the IMD downgrades Gaja to a severe cyclonic storm.
- 03:00 UTC at 10.4°N 78.5°E – the IMD downgrades Gaja to a cyclonic storm.
- 06:00 UTC at 10.5°N 77.6°E – the IMD downgrades Gaja to a deep depression.
- 06:00 UTC at 10.4°N 77.7°E – the JTWC downgrades Gaja to a tropical storm.
- 12:00 UTC at 10.1°N 76.4°E – the IMD downgrades Gaja to a depression.

November 17

- 00:00 UTC at 9.8°N 74.3°E – the IMD upgrades Gaja to a deep depression.

November 18

- 00:00 UTC at 10.5°N 70.0°E – the JTWC downgrades Gaja to a tropical depression.
- 12:00 UTC at 10.5°N 68.4°E – the JTWC downgrades Gaja to a disturbance.

November 19

- 06:00 UTC at 11.2°N 65.8°E – the IMD downgrades Gaja to a depression.
- 18:00 UTC – the IMD downgrades Gaja to a well-marked low.

=== December ===
December 13

- 00:00 UTC at 6.5°N 88.7°E – the IMD upgrades a well-marked low in the Bay of Bengal to a depression.
- 12:00 UTC at 6.9°N 88.9°E – the JTWC upgrades the system to a tropical depression, assigning it the designation 07B.
- 18:00 UTC at 7.6°N 88.0°E – the IMD upgrades 07B to a deep depression.

December 15

- 06:00 UTC at 9.7°N 85.4°E – the JTWC upgrades 07B to a tropical storm.
- 12:00 UTC at 10.3°N 84.9°E – the IMD upgrades 07B to a cyclonic storm, assigning it the name Phethai.

December 16

- 09:00 UTC at 12.6°N 83.6°E – the IMD upgrades Phethai to a severe cyclonic storm.
- 12:00 UTC at 13.3°N 83.0°E – the IMD estimates Phethai to have peaked in intensity with maximum 3-minute sustained winds of 100 km/h (65 mph) and a minimum central pressure of 992 hPa (mbar; 29.29 inHg).
- 12:00 UTC at 13.4°N 83.1°E – the JTWC estimates Phethai to have peaked in intensity with maximum 1-minute sustained winds of 100 km/h (65 mph).

December 17

- 03:00 UTC at 15.8°N 82.2°E – the IMD downgrades Phethai to a cyclonic storm.
- between 08:00 and 09:00 UTC at 16.55°N 82.25°E – Phethai makes landfall south of Yanam.
- 12:00 UTC at 16.9°N 82.4°E – the IMD downgrades Phethai to a deep depression.
- 12:00 UTC at 16.8°N 82.5°E – the JTWC downgrades Phethai to a tropical depression.
- between 14:00 and 15:00 UTC – Phethai makes landfall near Tuni.
- 18:00 UTC at 17.5°N 82.5°E – the IMD downgrades Phethai to a depression.

December 18

- 00:00 UTC – the IMD downgrades Phethai to a well-marked low.

== See also ==
- Timeline of the 2018 Atlantic hurricane season
- Timeline of the 2018 Pacific hurricane season
- Timeline of the 2018 Pacific typhoon season
