= Cyclone Phethai =

North Indian Ocean cyclone in 2018

Severe Cyclonic Storm Phethai
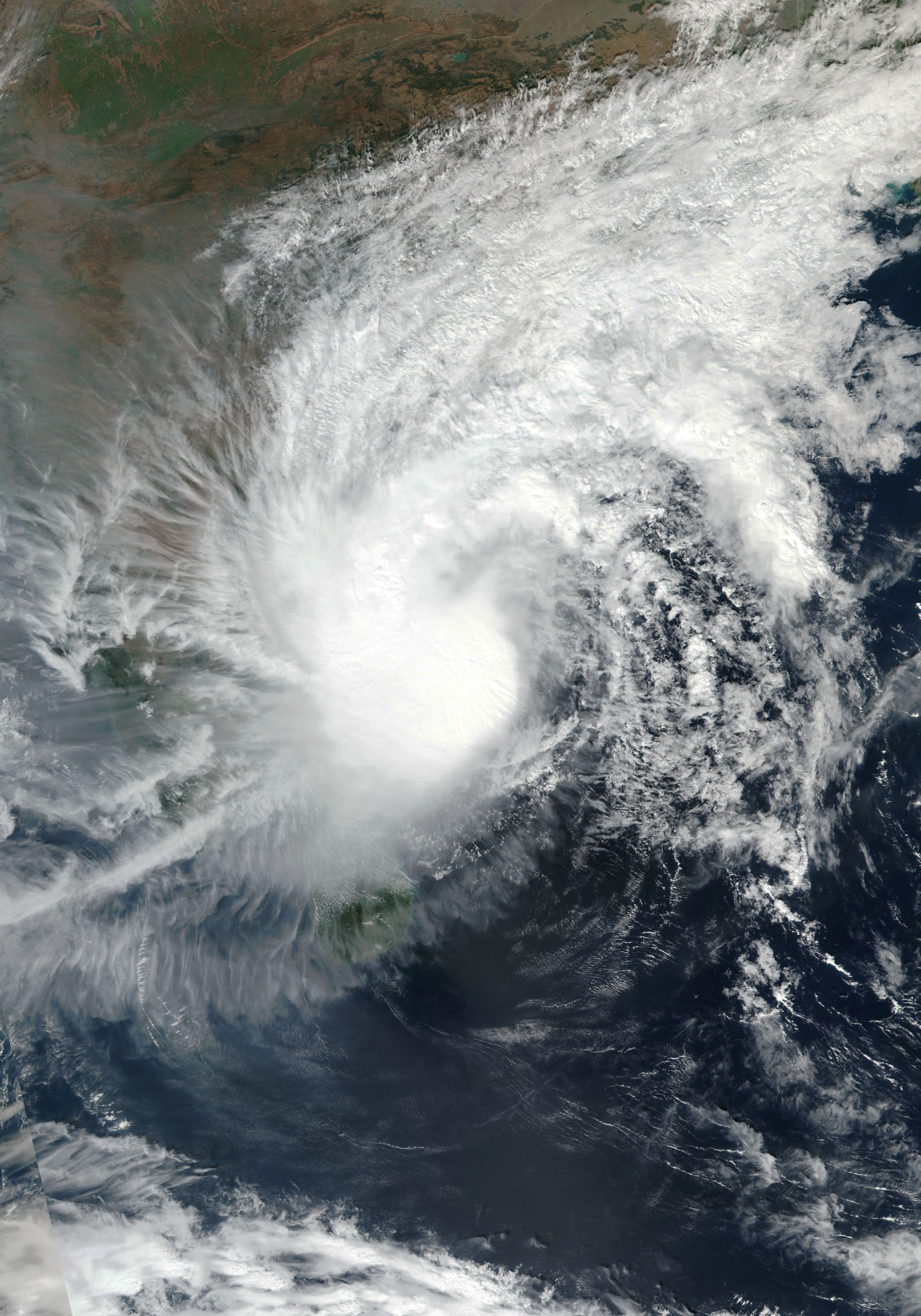
- Cyclone Phethai north of Sri Lanka on 15 December

Meteorological history
- Formed: 13 December 2018
- Dissipated: 17 December 2018

Severe cyclonic storm
- 3-minute sustained (IMD)
- Highest winds: 100 km/h (65 mph)
- Lowest pressure: 992 hPa (mbar); 29.29 inHg

Tropical storm
- 1-minute sustained (SSHWS/JTWC)
- Highest winds: 100 km/h (65 mph)
- Lowest pressure: 989 hPa (mbar); 29.21 inHg

Overall effects
- Fatalities: 8 total
- Damage: $100 million (2018 USD)
- Areas affected: Sri Lanka, East India, Northeast India
- IBTrACS
- Part of the 2018 North Indian Ocean cyclone season

Severe Cyclonic Storm Phethai (Note: The name Phethai (Thai: เพทาย, [pʰeː˧ tʰaːj˧]) was contributed by Thailand and means "zircon" in Thai.) was a tropical cyclone which affected some portions of Sri Lanka and India during December 2018. The fourteenth depression, ninth deep depression, seventh cyclonic storm, and fifth severe cyclonic storm of the 2018 North Indian Ocean cyclone season, Phethai developed from an area of low pressure that formed over the Bay of Bengal on 13 December. Having forecasted not to develop significantly, the depression then strengthened to a deep depression later that day before becoming a cyclonic storm on 15 December. Phethai further intensified and peaked to a severe cyclonic storm, the following day. The system then steadily weakened due to land interaction and increasing wind shear, before making landfall as a disorganized system over Andhra Pradesh on 17 December. It degenerated to an area of low-pressure inland later that day.

Phethai caused over eight fatalities during its path towards East India. Some rice crops and paddies were destroyed and flooded, while over 31,600 individuals were evacuated to different centers in Godavari District and Odisha. The total damages from the cyclone were finalized at $100 million (2018 USD).

== Meteorological history ==
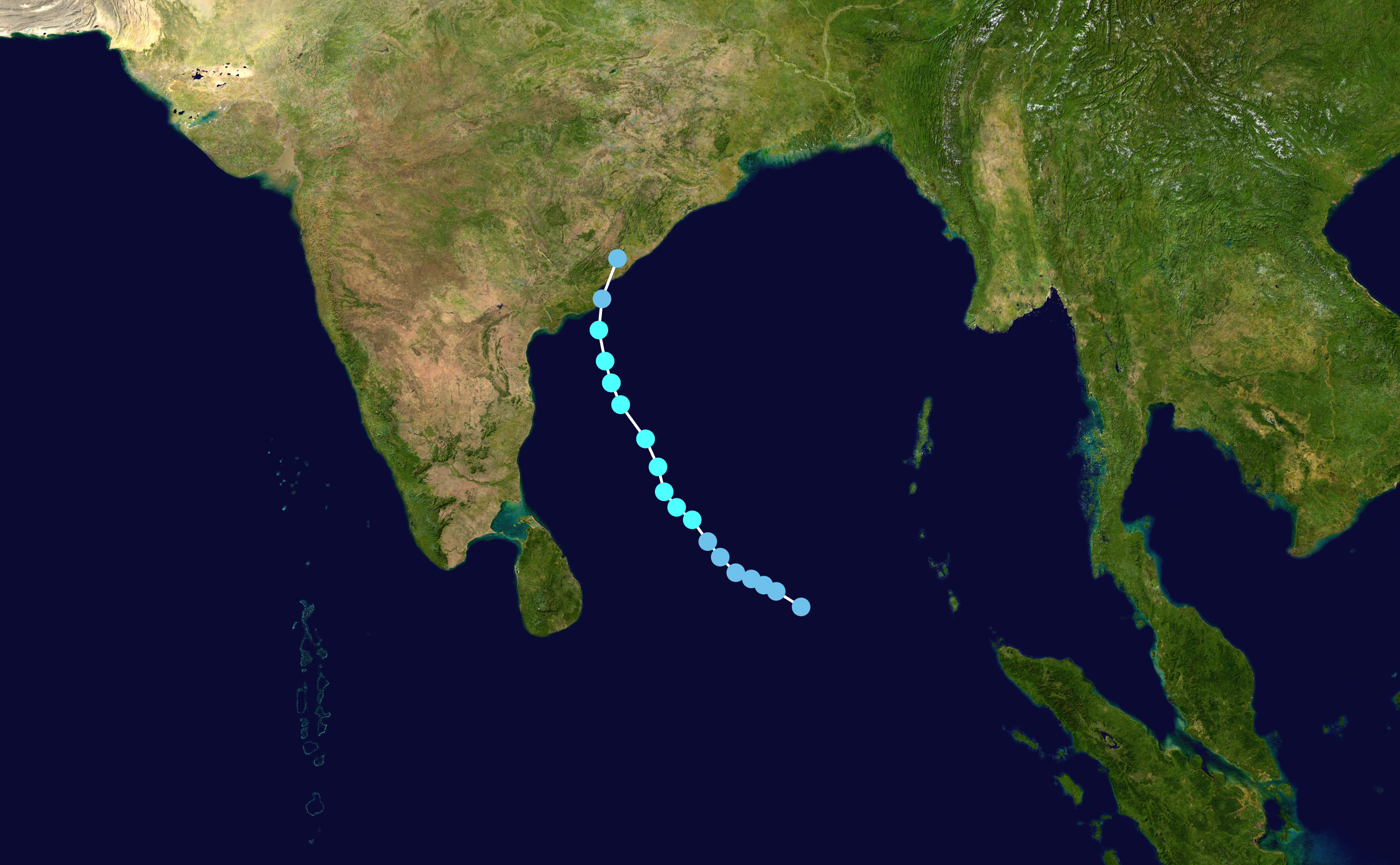
Map plotting the storm's track and intensity, according to the Saffir–Simpson scale Map key Saffir–Simpson scale Tropical depression (≤38 mph, ≤62 km/h) Tropical storm (39–73 mph, 63–118 km/h) Category 1 (74–95 mph, 119–153 km/h) Category 2 (96–110 mph, 154–177 km/h) Category 3 (111–129 mph, 178–208 km/h) Category 4 (130–156 mph, 209–251 km/h) Category 5 (≥157 mph, ≥252 km/h) Unknown Storm type Tropical cyclone Subtropical cyclone Extratropical cyclone, remnant low, tropical disturbance, or monsoon depression

At 06:00 UTC on 7 December, the India Meteorological Department (IMD) began to note in their bulletins that an area of low-pressure could significantly form over the Bay of Bengal over the next 48 hours. The American-based Joint Typhoon Warning Center (JTWC) also began to monitor the developing system later that day. The IMD later reported that a low-pressure area had formed over the Bay of Bengal, influenced by a trough of low pressure, at 12:00 UTC on 9 December. The agency noted that conditions would be favorable for the system to develop further, due to the Madden–Julian oscillation phase being at a three. Over the next couple of days, the low-pressure area produced moderate to deep convection, with the IMD designating the system as a well—marked low-pressure area on 11 December. At 3:00 UTC on 13 December, the IMD upgraded the low-pressure area into a tropical depression, while located roughly 530 miles (855 km) east-southeast of Trincomalee, Sri Lanka. At the same time, the JTWC issued a Tropical Cyclone Formation Alert (TCFA) on the system.

The depression moved north-northwestward towards the coast of India for the next few days, being steered by an anticyclone over Southeast Asia. While doing so, the depression strengthened into a deep depression according to the IMD, by 18:00 UTC on 13 December, while located about 645 miles (1,040 km) south-southeast of Chennai, Tamil Nadu. Deep convection associated with the system began to increase, while global prediction models suggested further strengthening. The JTWC released their first warning on the depression at 6:00 UTC on 15 December. Just 9 hours later, the deep depression strengthened into a cyclonic storm, and was provided the name Phethai by the IMD, while located around 480 miles (770 km) south-southeast of Machilipatnam, Andhra Pradesh. The storm changed little in appearance over the next 26 hours, before being upgraded into a severe cyclonic storm, at 17:30 UTC the next day. At this time, Phethai reached its peak intensity with 1–minute sustained winds of around 65 mph (105 km/h), and a minimum pressure of 992 mbar (29.29 inHg). The cyclone then maintained this intensity for over 12 hours before weakening due to increasing wind shear. By 6:00 UTC on 17 December, the structure of the storm began to disorganize, with the center becoming ill-defined. Shortly afterwards, Phethai moved onshore in Andhra Pradesh, near the town of Yanam, just a few hours later.

Just an hour later, the JTWC issued their final warning on Phethai, while it was located just off the coast of Eastern India. The IMD soon reported that the cyclone had weakened into a deep depression, inland over Andhra Pradesh, at 15:00 UTC that same day. The depression remained disorganized as it moved across Eastern India, making a second landfall in the country near Tuni. Phethai continued to weaken inland, being downgraded into a depression by 19:30 UTC that day. The IMD issued their final bulletin on the depression at 3:00 UTC the following day, as it degenerated into an area of low pressure over the northwestern Bay of Bengal, while producing minimal convection.

== Preparations ==
Cyclone Phethai affected areas still recovering from the impacts of cyclones Daye, Titli, and Gaja. Ahead of the storm, boats were prohibited from leaving port with fishing activities halted.

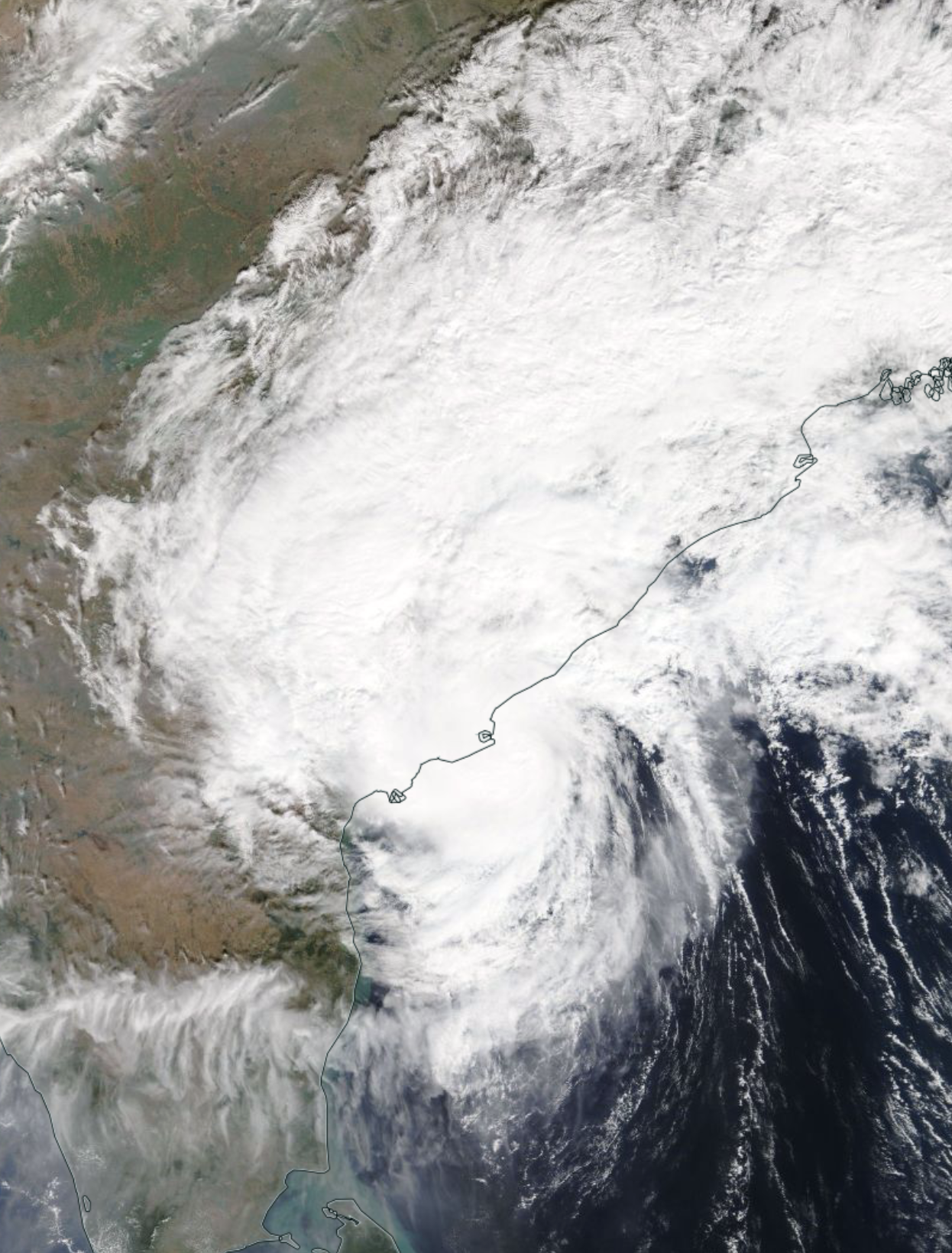
Cyclone Phethai making landfall near Yanam on 17 December

Roughly 10 shelters were opened within Andhra Pradesh. Over 2,000 electrical workers were assembled to help restore power in Phethai's aftermath. Police and firefighters formed special crews to help with debris removal from streets. Firefighters also prepared boats and lifejackets, with the National Disaster Response Force and State Disaster Response Force assembling seven rescue teams. Marketing departments arranged vegetables and necessities to provide to people staying at shelters. The Indian Coast Guard kept ships and aircraft along the country's east coast to help with aid efforts following the cyclone.

Over 10,000 people prepared for disaster response as the storm neared. Numerous flights heading to Visakhapatnam were cancelled, with trains being halted. N. Chandrababu Naidu, the chief minister of Andhra Pradesh, hosted a teleconference with the collector's of four districts in the state, where cyclone preparations were planned and discussed. Paddy crops were attempted to be saved by farmers in the Krishna and Godavari river deltas. Roughly 20,000 people were evacuated ahead of the cyclone in the nearby Godavari District. Within Krishna district, 68 relief centers, 15 health teams, and 155 firefighters were put on standby, as local officials prepared for the storm. The Rural Water Supply setup 3 water tankers in each of the district's villages, while also producing more than 500 sandbags. Machinery was also readied to help clear downed trees. While electrical departments ordered crews to be stationed every 6 miles (9.7 km), to quickly restore power.

In Odisha, roughly 11,600 residents were evacuated from the Gajapati district. These residents were evacuated due to the damage remaining from Cyclone Titli, just two months previously. Farmers in the state were asked to take measures to protect their crops from the results of heavy rainfall. The India Meteorological Department (IMD) warned of a chance of heavy rains in the northern part of Tamil Nadu.

Some fishing communities were advised to exercise cautions when fishing from Trincomalee to Mannar via Kankesanthurai in Sri Lanka. Gusty winds and some squally rainfall were also expected in these areas.

== Impact ==
Conditions before and after the passage of Phethai in Visakhapatnam.
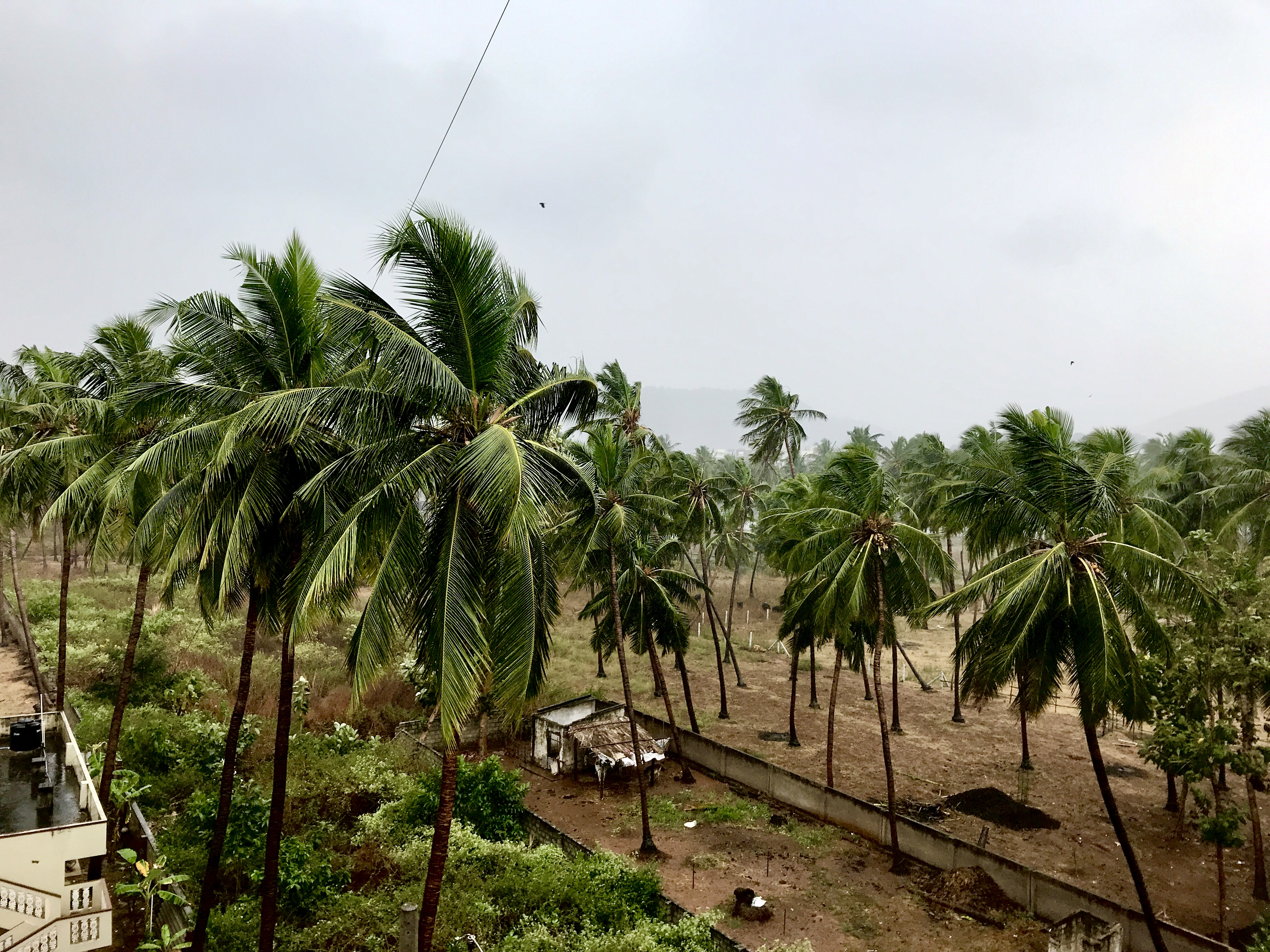
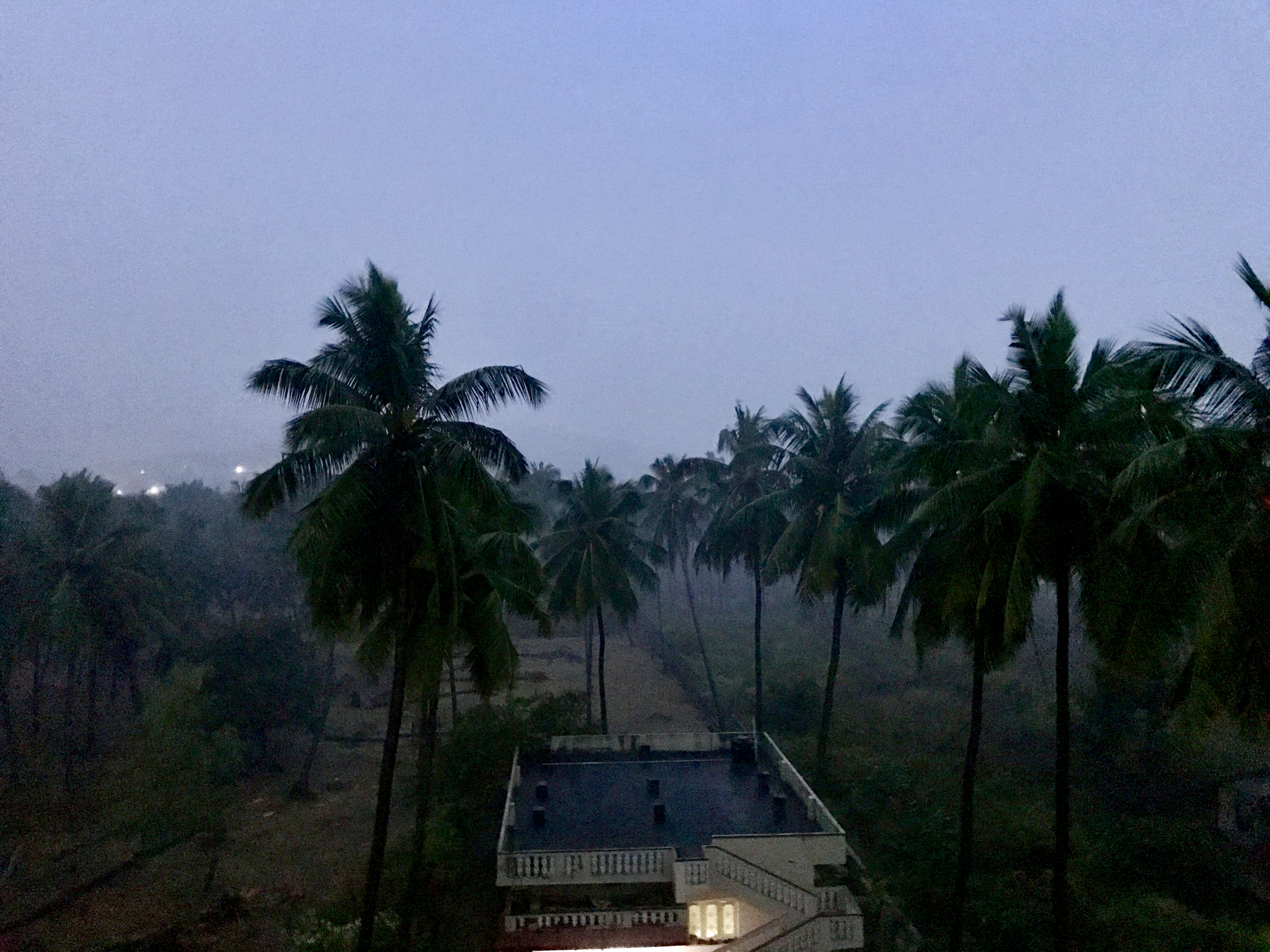

Showers and thunderstorms associated with Phethai affected Sri Lanka during its development. After moving onshore, Phethai brought torrential rainfall and strong winds in Andhra Pradesh which downed trees and electrical lines. A peak precipitation accumulation of 156.5 mm (6.16 in) was reported in the city of Ninnimamidivalasa in Visakhapatnam, while the village of Pachipenta recorded a rainfall amount of 136 mm. During the storm, seven fishermen went missing offshore the city.

A 40-year-old man was killed after a boulder crashed through his roof in Vijayawada. Another man in the city was hurtled down a small hill due to heavy rainfall, killing him. A 68-year-old woman was also killed in Pallepalem. In the East Godavari district, streets in more than 50 locations were left impassible but were quickly cleared. Power outages were reported in 99 villages within the district.

In the town of Amalapuram, a rare phenomenon of fish rain was reported along a canal on 17 December. A video of the incident went viral on social media, showing more than 100 bodies of fish on land near the canal. A possible cause of this occurrence was high wind bringing the bodies of fish and frogs onshore.

== Aftermath ==
Following the cyclone, the Government of Odisha began to assess damage to crops in the state. Some assistance would be given to the farmers regarding the major damages to rice paddies from the aftermath of the cyclone.

== See also ==
- Tropical cyclones in 2018
- Cyclone Fani (2019) — affected similar areas in May 2019.
