= Korlam =

- Village
- Interactive map of Korlam
- Location in Andhra Pradesh, India Korlam (India)
- Coordinates: 18.901408°N 84.552208°E
- Country: India
- State: Andhra Pradesh
- District: Srikakulam

Government
  - Type: Gram Panchayat

Population
  - Total: 3,531

Languages
  - Official: Telugu
- Time zone: UTC+5:30 (IST)
- PIN: 532264
- Vehicle registration: AP-30

Korlam is a village in Srikakulam district of the Indian state of Andhra Pradesh. It is located in Sompeta mandal.

== Demographics ==
Korlam village has population of 3,531 of which 1,648 are males while 1,883 are females as per Population 2011, Indian Census.
