= Cyclone Titli =

North Indian Ocean cyclone in 2018

Very Severe Cyclonic Storm Titli
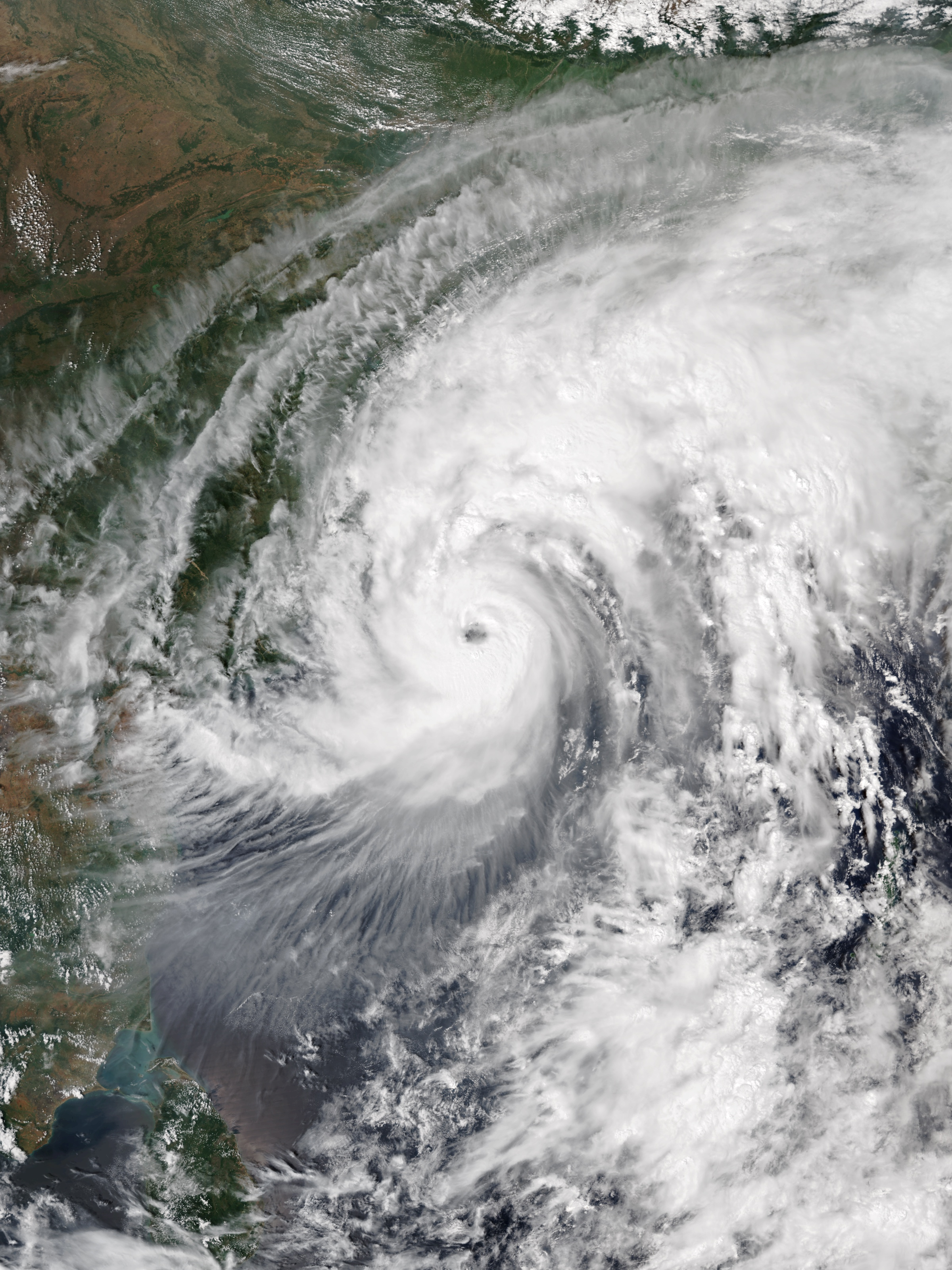
- Cyclone Titli at peak intensity approaching Andhra Pradesh and Odisha on 10 October

Meteorological history
- Formed: 8 October 2018
- Dissipated: 12 October 2018

Very severe cyclonic storm
- 3-minute sustained (IMD)
- Highest winds: 150 km/h (90 mph)
- Lowest pressure: 972 hPa (mbar); 28.70 inHg

Category 3-equivalent tropical cyclone
- 1-minute sustained (SSHWS/JTWC)
- Highest winds: 195 km/h (120 mph)
- Lowest pressure: 944 hPa (mbar); 27.88 inHg

Overall effects
- Fatalities: 89 total
- Damage: $920 million (2018 USD)
- Areas affected: Northern Andhra Pradesh, Odisha, West Bengal, Bangladesh
- IBTrACS
- Part of the 2018 North Indian Ocean cyclone season

Very Severe Cyclonic Storm Titli (Note: The name Titli (Urdu: تتلی, [t̪ɪt̪liː]) was contributed by Pakistan and means "butterfly" in Urdu.) was a deadly and destructive tropical cyclone that caused extensive damage to Eastern India in October 2018. Titli was the twelfth depression and fifth named storm to form in the 2018 North Indian Ocean cyclone season. Titli originated from a low pressure area in the Andaman Sea on 7 October. With warm sea surface temperatures and low wind shear, the low developed into a depression on 8 October in the central Bay of Bengal. It was tracked and followed by the India Meteorological Department (IMD), which also issued warnings and notices for the public. Titli continued to intensify as it moved toward the southeast Indian coast, becoming a very severe cyclonic storm, equivalent to a minimal hurricane on the Saffir–Simpson scale. It attained great intensity, at the same time Cyclone Luban in the Arabian Sea was on the same intensity, marking the first instance since 1977 of simultaneous storms. The IMD estimated peak winds of 150 km/h (95 mph), while the American-based Joint Typhoon Warning Center (JTWC) estimated peak winds of 195 km/h (120 mph). Late on 10 October, Titli made landfall in Andhra Pradesh, and it quickly weakened over land as it turned to the northeast. It degenerated into a remnant low on 12 October.

Ahead of the storm's landfall in the Indian state of Andhra Pradesh, about 300,000 people evacuated. Titli ultimately killed 89 people from its impacts, including 85 in India. The cyclone produced strong winds, with gusts to 126 km/h (78 mph), along with a storm surge that flooded coastal areas. The storm also dropped heavy rainfall as it moved through India. Mohana in Odisha recorded 460 mm (18 in) of rainfall over 48 hours. This caused floods and landslides, crop damage, fallen trees, and power outages that affected at least 400,000 people. Throughout India, Titli damaged 127,081 houses, forcing 63,562 people to stay in relief camps. Damage in the country was estimated at ₹6,673.1 crore (US$920 million). Four people died in Bangladesh due to landslides.

== Meteorological history ==
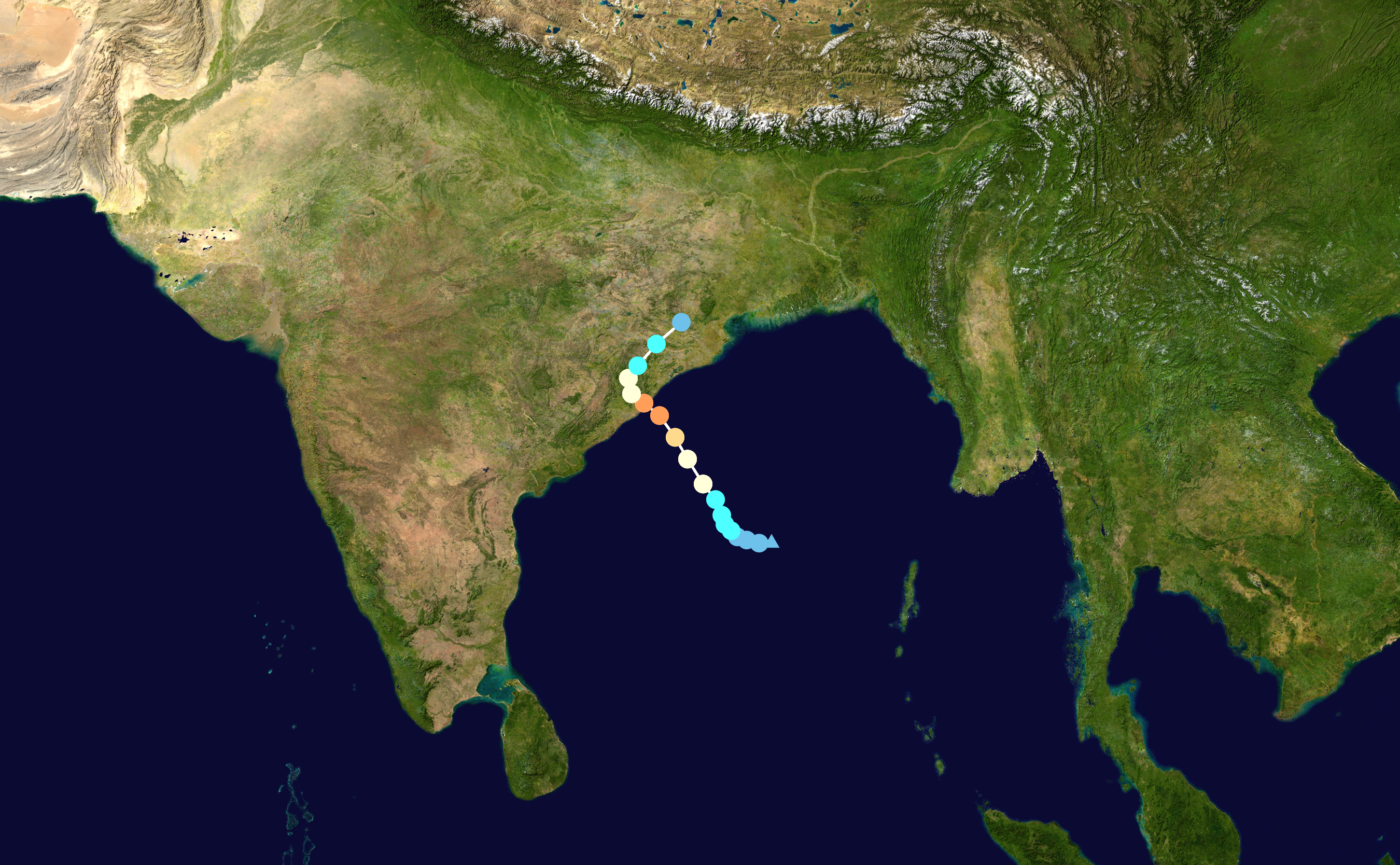
Map plotting the storm's track and intensity, according to the Saffir–Simpson scale Map key Saffir–Simpson scale Tropical depression (≤38 mph, ≤62 km/h) Tropical storm (39–73 mph, 63–118 km/h) Category 1 (74–95 mph, 119–153 km/h) Category 2 (96–110 mph, 154–177 km/h) Category 3 (111–129 mph, 178–208 km/h) Category 4 (130–156 mph, 209–251 km/h) Category 5 (≥157 mph, ≥252 km/h) Unknown Storm type Tropical cyclone Subtropical cyclone Extratropical cyclone, remnant low, tropical disturbance, or monsoon depression

As early as 3 October, the India Meteorological Department (IMD) anticipated the development of a tropical cyclone in the Bay of Bengal. Environmental conditions for development included warm sea surface temperatures up to 31 °C (88 °F) and low wind shear. Early on 7 October, a low pressure area developed in the Andaman Sea, accompanied by intense convection, or thunderstorms. A weak anticyclone was located over an elongated low-level circulation associated with the system. With tropical cyclone forecast models uncertain about the system's future, the American-based Joint Typhoon Warning Center (JTWC) assessed a low chance for development on 7 October. On 8 October, the system organized into a depression in the central Bay of Bengal, supported by a moist environment.

The circulation gradually became better organized, developing outflow in its periphery. The depression moved generally northwestward toward the southeast coast of India, steered by a ridge to its northeast. With favorable conditions, the depression gradually strengthened, first to a deep depression late on 8 October, and further into a cyclonic storm early the next day; at that time, the IMD named the storm Titli. Also on 9 October, the JTWC initiated warnings on the system, classifying it as Tropical Cyclone 06B. As it approached the coast of India, Titli underwent rapid deepening as its structure evolved into a mature cyclone. The storm intensified into a severe cyclonic storm late on 9 October. Early the next day, Titli strengthened further into a very severe cyclonic storm, as an eye formed in the center of the thunderstorms. At the same time, Very Intense Cyclonic Storm Luban was located in the Arabian Sea, marking the first time since 1977 where there were two simultaneous very severe cyclonic storms in the North Indian Ocean. Titli continued strengthening, with estimated peak winds of 150 km/h (95 mph) according to the IMD. Meanwhile, the JTWC assessed that the cyclone reached peak winds of 195 km/h (120 mph), the equivalent of a Category 3 on the Saffir–Simpson scale.

Late on 10 October, Titli made landfall near Palasa, Andhra Pradesh, at peak intensity, as its eye contracted to a diameter of 12 km (7.5 mi). The storm quickly weakened over land as it turned to the northeast through Odisha state, encountering cooler, drier air as it moved around the western end of the ridge. By late on 11 October, Titli fell back to depression status. It moved into West Bengal and weakened into a well-marked low on 12 October, spreading into neighboring Bangladesh.

== Preparations, impacts, and aftermath ==
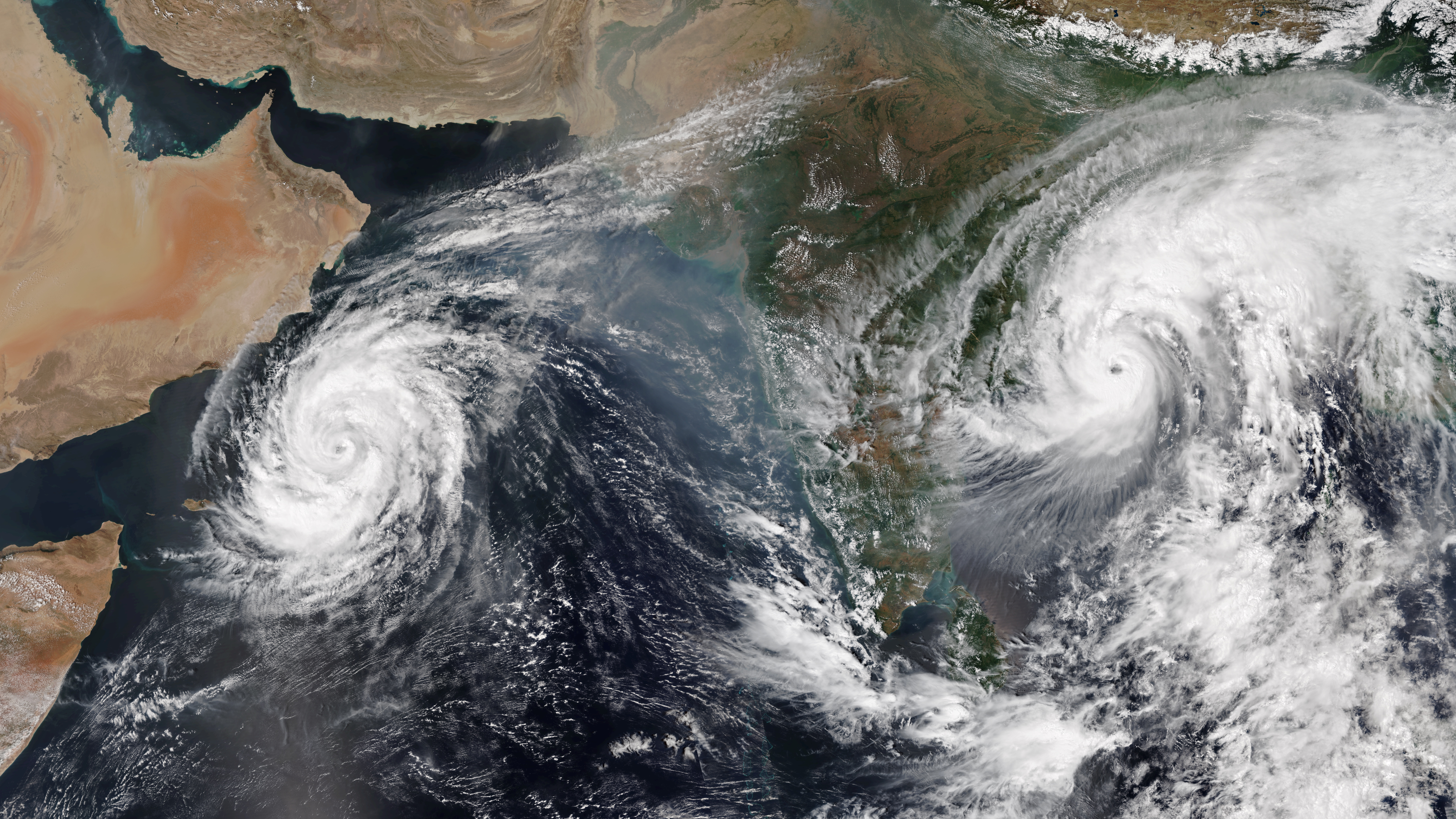
Very Severe Cyclonic Storms Luban (left) and Titli (right) over the Arabian Sea and the Bay of Bengal, respectively, on 10 October 2018 as two simultaneous cyclones

Ahead of Titli's landfall, officials in India and Bangladesh warned for fishermen to avoid sailing through Titli in the Bay of Bengal and to seek shelter. The IMD issued various bulletins and warnings for the public via social media, WhatsApp, and other briefings to the press. Officials advised people in coastal areas to evacuate, and ultimately about 300,000 people left their houses, using about 2,000 shelters and relief camps. 123 pregnant women were transported to hospitals as a precaution. Schools and child-care centers were closed in parts of Odisha. The Bangladesh Inland Water Transport Authority suspended river transport vessels during the passage of the storm.

While moving through southeastern India, Titli dropped heavy rainfall. Mohana, Odisha recorded 460 mm (18 in) of rainfall over 48 hours. Tekkali in northeastern Andhra Pradesh recorded 330 mm (13 in) of precipitation over the same time period. Heavy rainfall also occurred in West Bengal and across northeast India. In addition to floods from rainfall, Titli produced a storm surge as it moved ashore. Palasa in Andhra Pradesh recorded a water rise of about 1 m (3.3 ft). The cyclone also produced strong winds near its landfall point, with gusts estimated as high as 165 km/h (105 mph). Korlam in extreme northeastern Andhra Pradesh recorded wind gusts of 126 km/h (78 mph).

Across southeastern India, Titli killed 85 people, with eight of the deaths in Andhra Pradesh, and the other 77 in Odisha. In Gajapati district in Odisha, a single landslide killed 12 people, after residents sought refuge in a cave. Other deaths occurred due to floods, housing damage, and falling trees. Damage from flooding caused by Titli totaled at ₹3,673.1 crore (US$507 million) in Andhra Pradesh, and ₹3,000 crore (US$413 million) in Odisha. Along its path, Titli damaged 127,081 houses, forcing 63,562 people to stay in relief camps. Floodwaters entered the jail in Asika. Two major rivers, the Rushikulya and the Vamsadhara, swelled to reach dangerous levels, causing flooding in three districts that affected more than 600,000 people. The cyclone uprooted many trees along its path, blocking roads and knocking down power lines. Authorities estimated that 6,000 to 7,000 electrical poles were uprooted by Titli's strong winds. As a result, 400,000 to 500,000 people were without power in Andhra Pradesh. In Srikakulam, residents faced water shortages when the storm polluted wells and water systems. At least five bridges were damaged across the area. Floods damaged more than 3,785 km^{2} (1,461 sq mi) of crops, and killed many farm animals, including more than 40,000 birds. Titli caused major destruction to the East Coast railway, forcing the cancellation of at least six trains. In Visakhapatnam along the coast, the winds damaged six boats. Three people were lost when their boat went missing from Vizianagaram.

To help residents affected by the storm, the Odisha government provided financial compensation to families for 15 days, with a family of four receiving more than ₹3,000 (US$22). After the storm, 15 teams from the National Disaster Response Force, along with the Odisha Disaster Rapid Action Force, were placed around Odisha. Firefighters and other crews removed trees from roads. Officials provided meals and plastic sheeting for people affected by storm damage. Helicopters dropped meals to people in difficult to reach areas. Caritas India, a Catholic relief organization, provided families with sheeting and cleaning, including mosquito nets, blankets, and tarpaulins.

In Andhra Pradesh, N. Chandrababu Naidu announced a series of relief measures to provide relief to people in Srikakulam District. After having undertaken visits to Mandals such as Vajrapukotturu and Palasa he ensured the supply of 50 kg worth rice to those belonging to the Fishermen community and 25 kg to those belonging to other communities. The government would also ensure the supply of other necessary goods such as potatoes, pulses and onions. Moreover, a compensation of Rs.1 lakh was given to the next to kin of the 7 people who lost their lives, along with other compensatory measures such as Rs. 1000 to those whose houses and shops were damaged, Rs. 5000 compensation for loss of cattle and compensation to farmers for damage to crops on basis of a survey. He also prioritized the immediate restoration of drinking water and power, clearing of roads by removing uprooted trees and undertaking repair work of railway stations and railway quarters.

Cyclone Titli's effects extended into Bangladesh, where Cox's Bazar recorded three days of heavy rainfall. There, the storm damaged at least 15 buildings, including some facilities for Rohingya refugee camps. Landslides in Chittagong killed four people after wrecking two houses.

== See also ==
- Cyclone Amphan
- Cyclone Fani
