= Cyclone Luban =

Category 2 Indian ocean cyclone in 2018

Very Severe Cyclonic Storm Luban
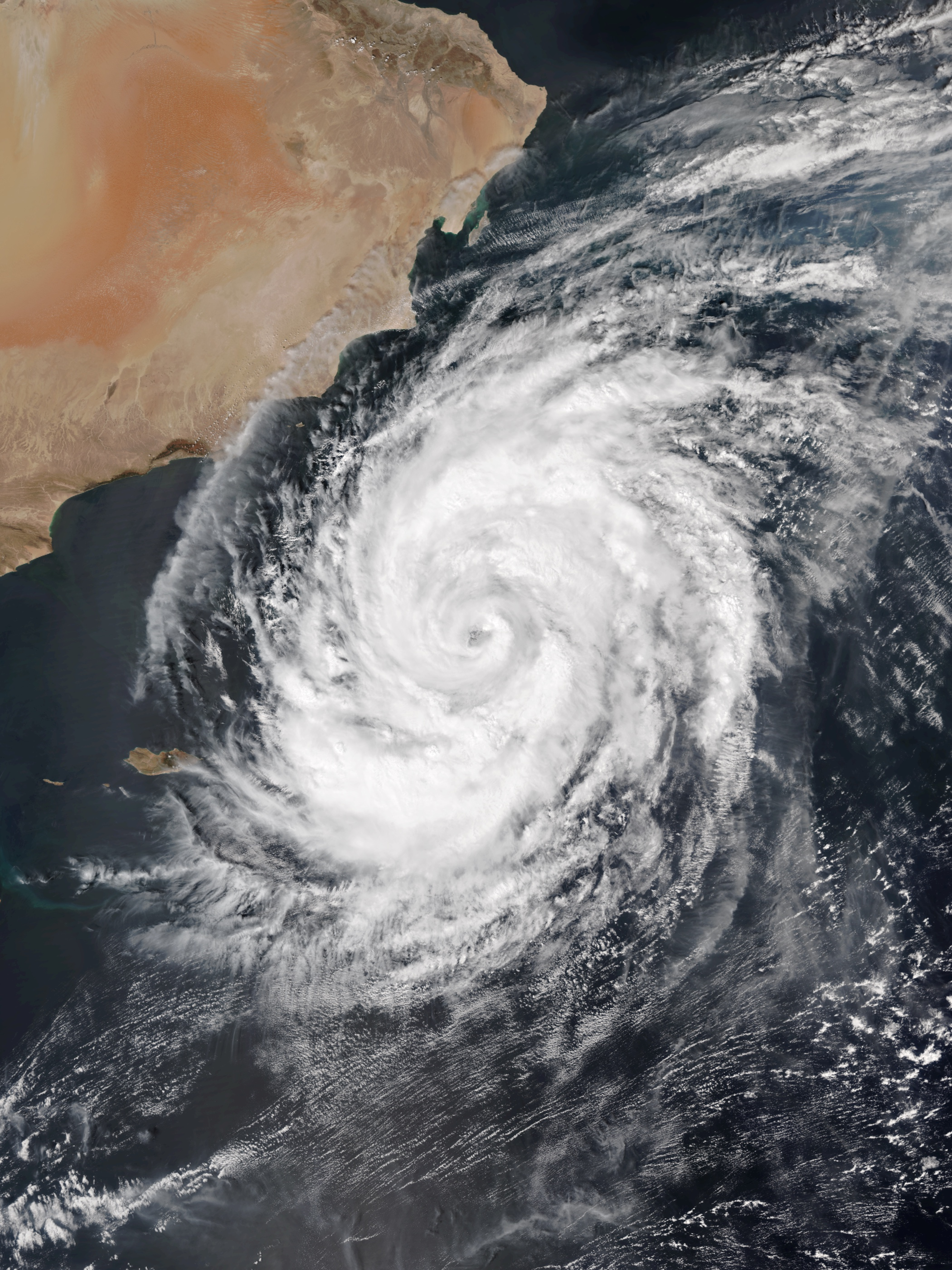
- Cyclone Luban at peak intensity on October 10

Meteorological history
- Formed: October 6, 2018
- Dissipated: October 15, 2018

Very severe cyclonic storm
- 3-minute sustained (IMD)
- Highest winds: 140 km/h (85 mph)
- Lowest pressure: 978 hPa (mbar); 28.88 inHg

Category 2-equivalent tropical cyclone
- 1-minute sustained (SSHWS/JTWC)
- Highest winds: 155 km/h (100 mph)
- Lowest pressure: 959 hPa (mbar); 28.32 inHg

Overall effects
- Fatalities: 14 total
- Damage: $1 billion (2018 USD)
- Areas affected: Oman, Somalia, Yemen
- IBTrACS
- Part of the 2018 North Indian Ocean cyclone season

Very Severe Cyclonic Storm Luban (Note: The name Luban (Arabic: لبان, [lubaːn]) was contributed by Oman and refers to an aromatic resin from the frankincense tree (Boswellia sacra) in Arabic.) was the third tropical cyclone to affect the Arabian Peninsula during the 2018 North Indian Ocean cyclone season, after cyclones Sagar and Mekunu in May. Luban developed on October 6 in the central Arabian Sea, and for much of its duration, maintained a general west-northwestward trajectory. On October 10, the India Meteorological Department (IMD) upgraded Luban to a very severe cyclonic storm – equivalent to a Category 1 hurricane – and estimated maximum sustained winds of 140 km/h (85 mph). The storm made landfall on October 14 in eastern Yemen, as a cyclonic storm. The storm quickly weakened over the dry, mountainous terrain of the Arabian Peninsula, before dissipating on October 15.

Upon moving ashore, Cyclone Luban produced flooding rains in Somalia, Oman, and Yemen. The cyclone killed 14 people in Yemen, when heavy rainfall cut off villages and damaged roads. Damage in the country was estimated at US$1 billion. (Note: All damage totals are in 2018 United States dollars unless otherwise noted.) In Oman, desert rainfall caused a small locust outbreak. Luban coexisted with Very Severe Cyclonic Storm Titli in the Bay of Bengal, marking the first time since 1971 that two storms of such intensity were active at the same time in the North Indian Ocean.

== Meteorological history ==
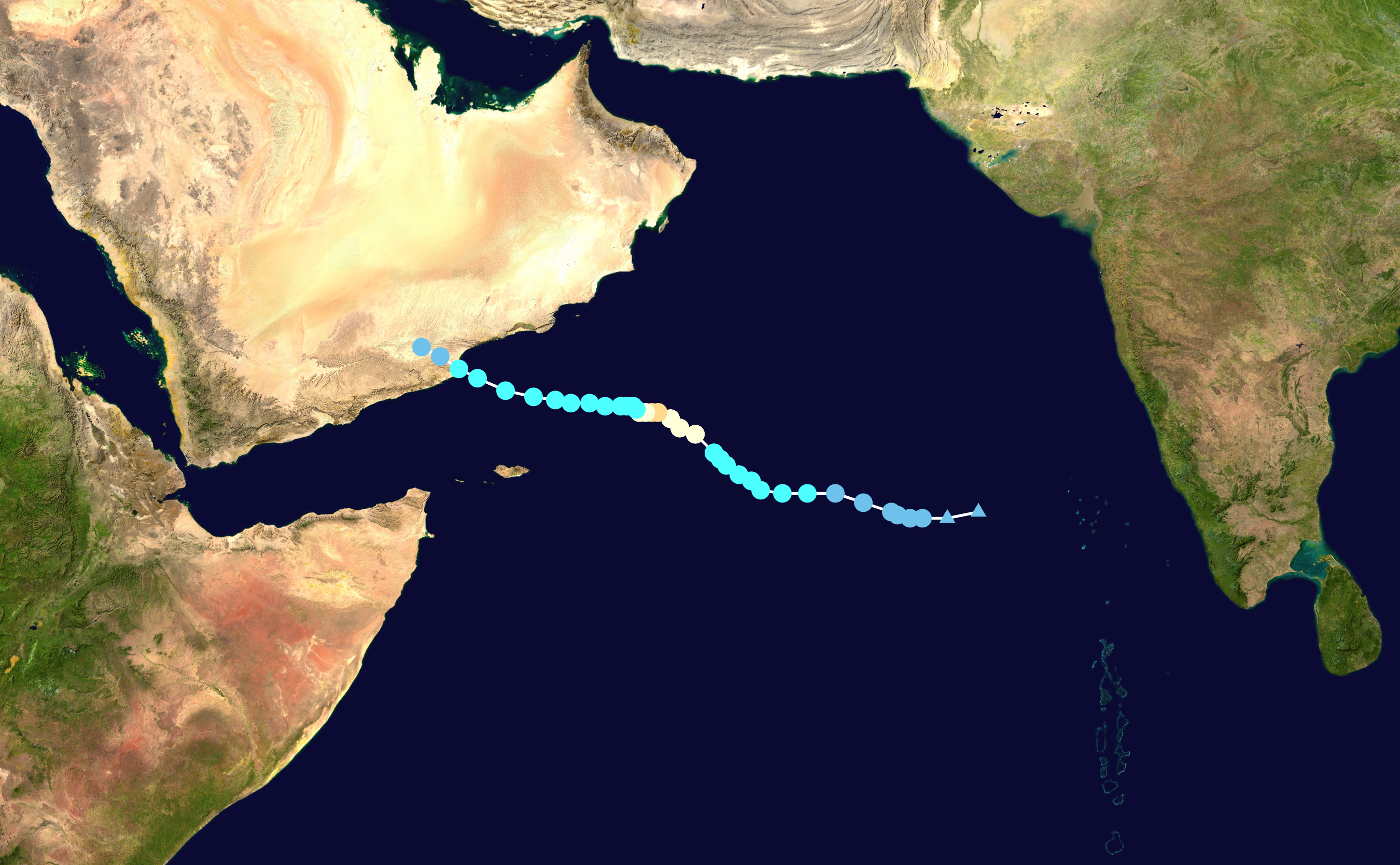
Map plotting the storm's track and intensity, according to the Saffir–Simpson scale Map key Saffir–Simpson scale Tropical depression (≤38 mph, ≤62 km/h) Tropical storm (39–73 mph, 63–118 km/h) Category 1 (74–95 mph, 119–153 km/h) Category 2 (96–110 mph, 154–177 km/h) Category 3 (111–129 mph, 178–208 km/h) Category 4 (130–156 mph, 209–251 km/h) Category 5 (≥157 mph, ≥252 km/h) Unknown Storm type Tropical cyclone Subtropical cyclone Extratropical cyclone, remnant low, tropical disturbance, or monsoon depression

On October 4, an upper-level low persisted over the southeast Arabian Sea. That day, the American-based Joint Typhoon Warning Center (JTWC) first mentioned an area of scattered convection southwest of India as an area for potential tropical cyclogenesis, due to projections from tropical cyclone forecast models. The convective system was located in the warm waters of the Arabian Sea in an area of low wind shear. The circulation slowly became more defined, developing a low-pressure area on October 5. On October 6, the India Meteorological Department (IMD) designated the system as Depression ARB 04. A day later, the agency upgraded the system to a deep depression, and on October 8, the IMD upgraded it further to Cyclonic Storm Luban. On the same day, the JTWC initiated advisories on Luban, giving it the designation Tropical Cyclone 05A.

By that time the JTWC initiated advisories, Luban had rotating rainbands around a persistent central area of thunderstorms, with good outflow to the north. The circulation became better defined over time, steered generally west-northwestward by a subtropical ridge to its north. On October 9, the IMD upgraded Luban to a severe cyclonic storm, as the thunderstorms continued to bloom over the circulation. A day later, the IMD upgraded Luban further to a very severe cyclonic storm, with maximum sustained winds of at least 120 km/h (75 mph), equivalent to a hurricane. Luban coexisted with Very Severe Cyclonic Storm Titli, marking the first time since 1977 that two storms of such intensity were active at the same time in the North Indian Ocean. The JTWC also upgraded Luban to the same intensity on October 10, noting the development of an eye feature. Both the IMD and the JTWC estimated that Luban attained a peak winds of 140 km/h (85 mph). They also forecasted that the storm would continue its general trajectory and strike the Arabian Peninsula.

Caught between two ridges, Luban moved slowly toward the Arabian Peninsula. The slow movement caused upwelling, which cooled the waters, thus weakening the cyclone despite otherwise favorable conditions. The central core of convection diminished and became restricted to the eastern side of the circulation. On October 13, thunderstorm activity increased over the center, signaling some re-intensification. Luban again weakened as it approached land, affected by the cooler water and air temperatures. On October 14, around 06:00 UTC, Luban made landfall in eastern Yemen, about 30 km (20 mi) south of Al Ghaydah, with winds of 75 km/h (45 mph). The storm rapidly weakened over the dry and mountainous terrain, degenerating into a well-marked low on October 15.

== Preparations, impact, and aftermath ==
The IMD advised fishermen not to go into deep waters of the Arabian Sea and the Gulf of Aden. Omani officials closed schools and recommended that residents in the storm's path to avoid low-lying areas. As Luban made landfall, the storm dropped heavy rainfall in southern Oman that caused flash flooding. Dalkout reported a 24-hour precipitation total of 145 mm (5.71 in) and Salalah of 138 mm (5.43 in). The rains created temporary lakes between desert dunes, which produced a small locust outbreak. To the south of the center, the outer rainbands of Luban dropped rains in Puntland, Somalia.

Cyclone Luban struck Yemen in the midst of a civil war and a cholera outbreak. The United Nations Population Fund moved 1,250 rapid response kits to coastal areas of Yemen in anticipation of Luban's landfall. Medical teams also moved to the region on standby in preparation for storm victims. Luban dropped heavy rainfall upon moving ashore, reaching 290 mm (11 in) in Al Ghaydah; there, wind gusts reached 102 km/h (63 mph). Luban caused about US$1 billion in damage in Yemen, with the worst effects in Al Mahrah Governorate, where about 90% of the infrastructure was damaged. The storm killed 14 people in the country, and 124 people were injured, with 10 people missing. About 8,000 people were left homeless because of Luban. Storm damage forced 2,203 families to leave their houses, using 38 schools for shelter. Flooding washed away thousands of livestock, and damaged Yemen's coastal roads and bridges, which disrupted relief efforts. Dirt roads were washed away, isolating seven villages and about 3,000 people. The port of Nishtun was closed during the storm, but was reopened in the subsequent weeks. In Al-Masilah, flooding damaged or destroyed 62 houses. The storm damaged the hospital in Qishn District, forcing all workers to evacuate, and shutting down the facility for at least a week. The storm damaged about 90% of the power grid in Al Ghaydah. Many areas lost access to clean water after wells were destroyed. The Yemeni Red Crescent operated search and rescue missions, with help from a helicopter sent by Saudi Arabia.

In the storm's aftermath, various governments and non-governmental organizations provided emergency supplies to residents affected by Luban. The King Salman Relief Centre sent two trucks from Aden to the worst affected areas to distribute tents, blankets, and mattresses. The Oman Charitable Organization sent seven trucks with food and other supplies to eastern Yemen. The World Health Organization sent three tons of medical supplies, including kits for cholera, malaria, and general trauma. About 10 days after the storm struck, the Emirates Red Crescent reconnected seven villages after clearing debris and restoring the dirt roads. Al Mahrah Governorate allocated ﷼2 billion (US$2.55 million) for repairing public facilities.

== See also ==
- List of Arabian Peninsula tropical cyclones
- Cyclone Chapala
- Cyclone Megh
- Cyclone Titli
- Cyclone Tej
