= Tropical cyclones in 2018 =

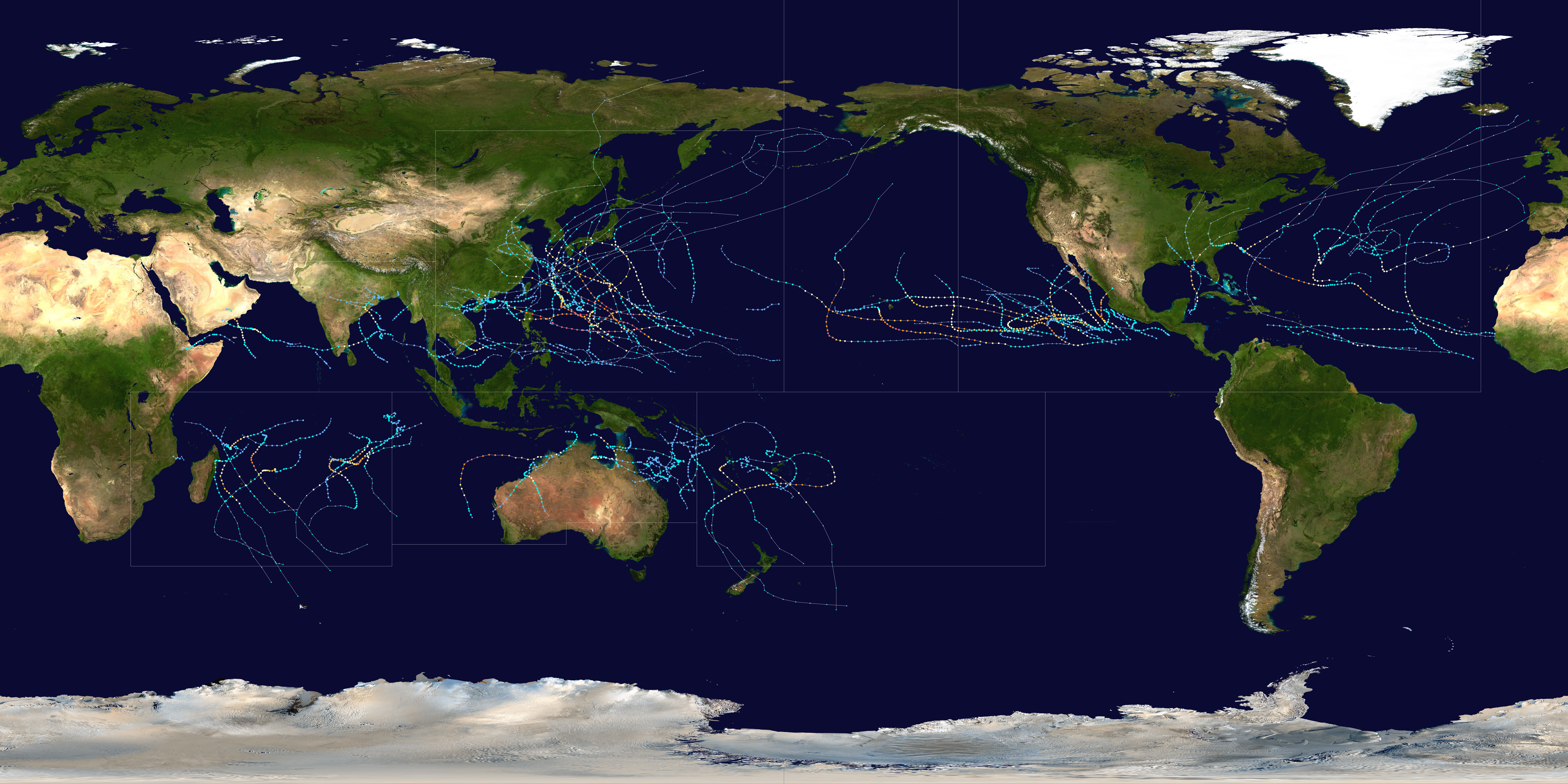
- Year summary map

Year boundaries
- First system: 07U
- Formed: January 1, 2018
- Last system: Penny
- Dissipated: January 9, 2019

Strongest system
- Name: Kong-rey & Yutu
- Lowest pressure: 900 mbar (hPa); 26.58 inHg

Longest lasting system
- Name: Iris & Leslie
- Duration: 21 days

Year statistics
- Total systems: 134
- Named systems: 101
- Total fatalities: 1,402 total
- Total damage: > $88 billion (2018 USD)
Related articles
- 2018 Atlantic hurricane season
- 2018 Pacific hurricane season
- 2018 Pacific typhoon season
- 2018 North Indian Ocean cyclone season
- 2017–18 South-West Indian Ocean cyclone season
- 2018–19 South-West Indian Ocean cyclone season
- 2017–18 Australian region cyclone season
- 2018–19 Australian region cyclone season
- 2017–18 South Pacific cyclone season
- 2018–19 South Pacific cyclone season

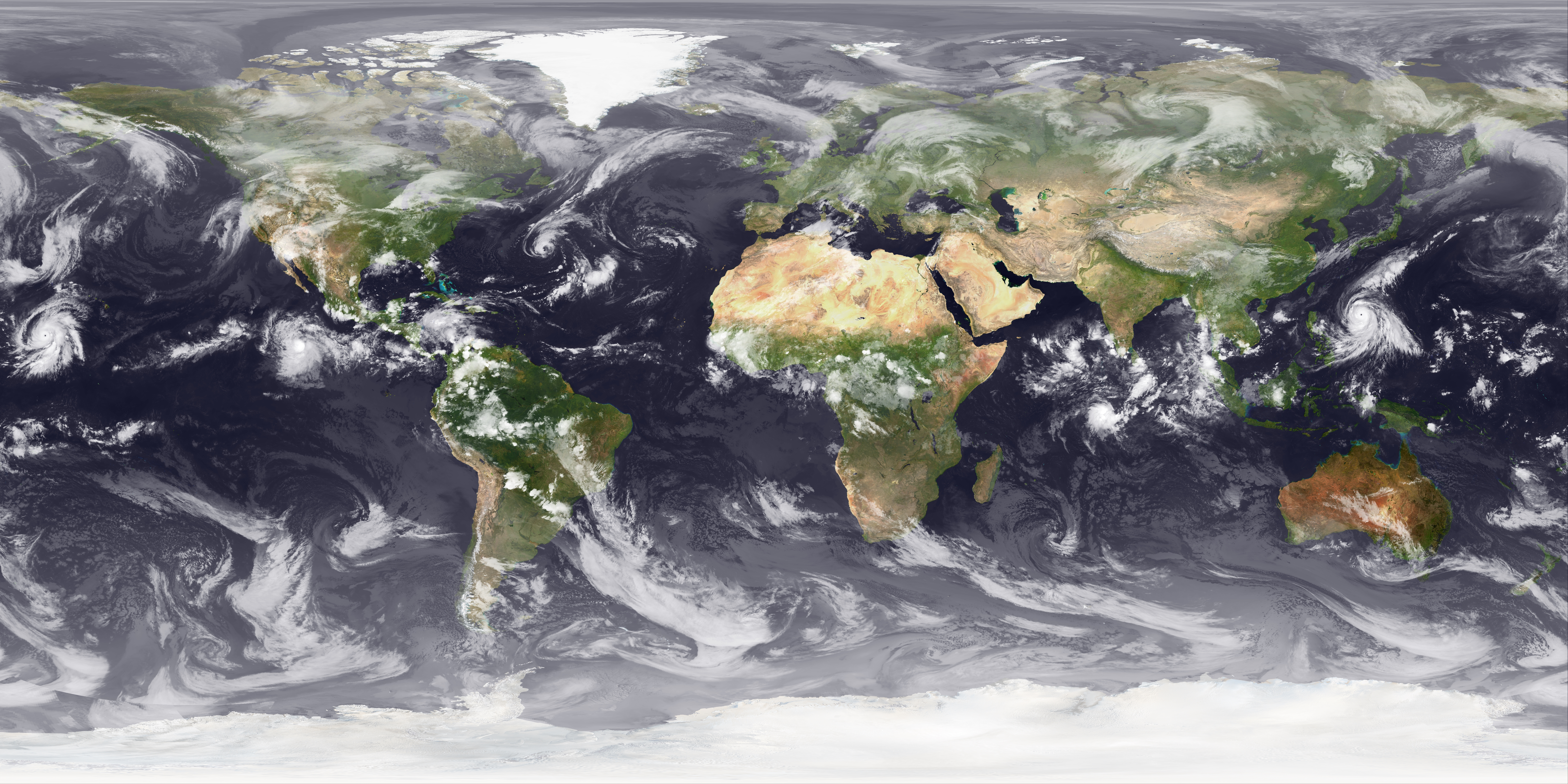
Hurricanes Walaka and Sergio, Tropical Depression Rosa, Tropical Storm Leslie and Typhoon Kong-rey on October 2, 2018

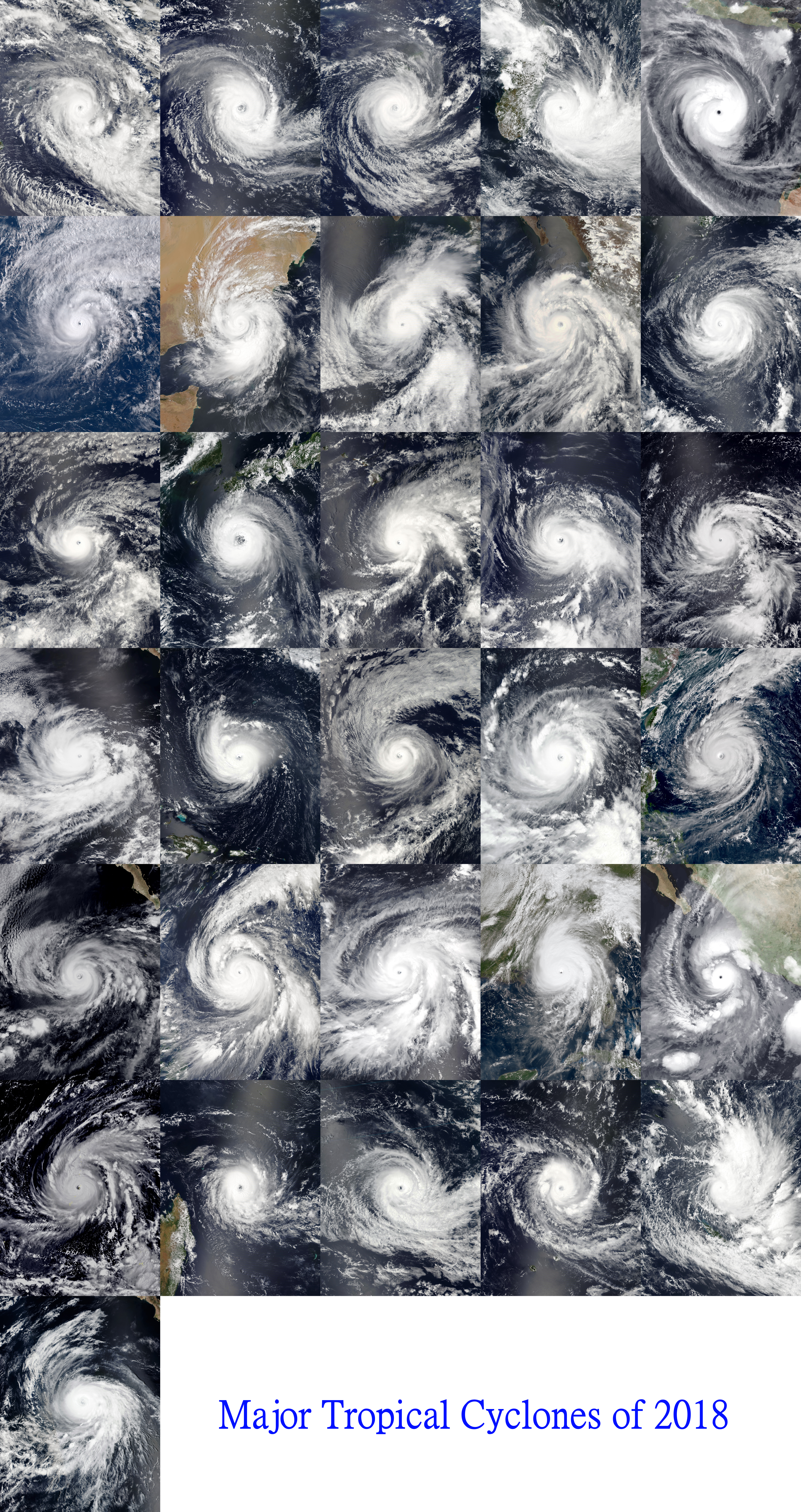
Taken by various of satellites throughout 2018, these are the 31 tropical cyclones that reached at least Category 3 on the Saffir-Simpson scale during that year, from Berguitta in January to Cilida in December (though Hola and Sergio are out of order).

The year 2018 was one of the most active years on record and was also regarded as the second-most intense tropical cyclone year on record, only behind 1997 and 1992. During the year, tropical cyclones formed within seven different tropical cyclone basins, located within various parts of the Atlantic, Pacific and Indian Oceans. A total of 151 tropical cyclones had formed this year to date. 102 tropical cyclones were named by either a Regional Specialized Meteorological Center (RSMC) or a Tropical Cyclone Warning Center (TCWC). The strongest tropical cyclone was Typhoon Mangkhut with a minimum pressure of 896 mbar/hPa (26.46 inHg), while the costliest tropical cyclone of the year was Hurricane Michael in the Atlantic, which struck Florida in October, causing US$25.1 billion in damage. The deadliest tropical cyclone of the year was Tropical Storm Son-Tinh in the West Pacific, which killed 170 people in Vietnam and Laos. Among this year's systems, thirty-one became major tropical cyclones, including twenty-five tropical cyclones of Categories 4 and 5. Eleven Category 5 tropical cyclones were formed and the accumulated cyclone energy (ACE) index for 2018 (seven basins combined), as calculated by Colorado State University (CSU), was 1,108.4 units, the second-highest after 1997.

The most active basin in the year was the Western Pacific, which documented 28 named systems. The Eastern Pacific also saw an incredibly above-average year with 23 named systems, and produced the highest accumulated cyclone energy on record in the basin until it was surpassed in 2026. Activity in the Atlantic Basin was unusually above average, with 15 tropical storms developing, despite the El Niño, which would usually suppress Atlantic activity. The North Indian Ocean was also above average, documenting seven named storms, making it the second-most active season in the basin's history since reliable records began. Activity across the Southern Hemisphere's three basins—South-West Indian, Australian, and South Pacific—was spread evenly, with each region recording seven named storms apiece.

Tropical cyclones are primarily monitored by a group of ten warning centers, which have been designated as a Regional Specialized Meteorological Centre (RSMC) or a Tropical Cyclone Warning Center (TCWC) by the World Meteorological Organization. These are the United States National Hurricane Center (NHC) and Central Pacific Hurricane Center, the Japan Meteorological Agency (JMA), the Indian Meteorological Department (IMD), Météo-France (MFR), Indonesia's Badan Meteorologi, Klimatologi, dan Geofisika, the Australian Bureau of Meteorology (BOM), Papua New Guinea's National Weather Service, the Fiji Meteorological Service (FMS) as well as New Zealand's MetService. Other notable warning centers include the Philippine Atmospheric, Geophysical, and Astronomical Services Administration (PAGASA), the United States Joint Typhoon Warning Center (JTWC), and the Brazilian Navy Hydrographic Center(BNHC).

== Global Atmospheric and Hydrological Conditions ==
In the Pacific Ocean, tropical cyclone activity was enhanced due to the above-average sea surface temperatures and the development of El Niño during the second half of the year. The eastern North Pacific experienced one of its active seasons on record, setting records for accumulated cyclone energy (ACE) and major hurricane days. Studies have also linked the basin's exceptional activity to warming in the subtropical North Pacific associated with the positive phase of the Pacific Meridional Mode.

In the North Atlantic Ocean, atmospheric and hydrological conditions were generally unfavorable for tropical cyclogenesis. In the tropical Atlantic, sea surface temperatures were cooler than average, characteristic of a negative phase of the Atlantic multidecadal oscillation (AMO). Additionally, high quantities of Saharan dust along with stronger-than-average upper-level wind shear over the tropical Atlantic created an unfavorable atmospheric environment.

== Summary ==
=== North Atlantic Ocean ===
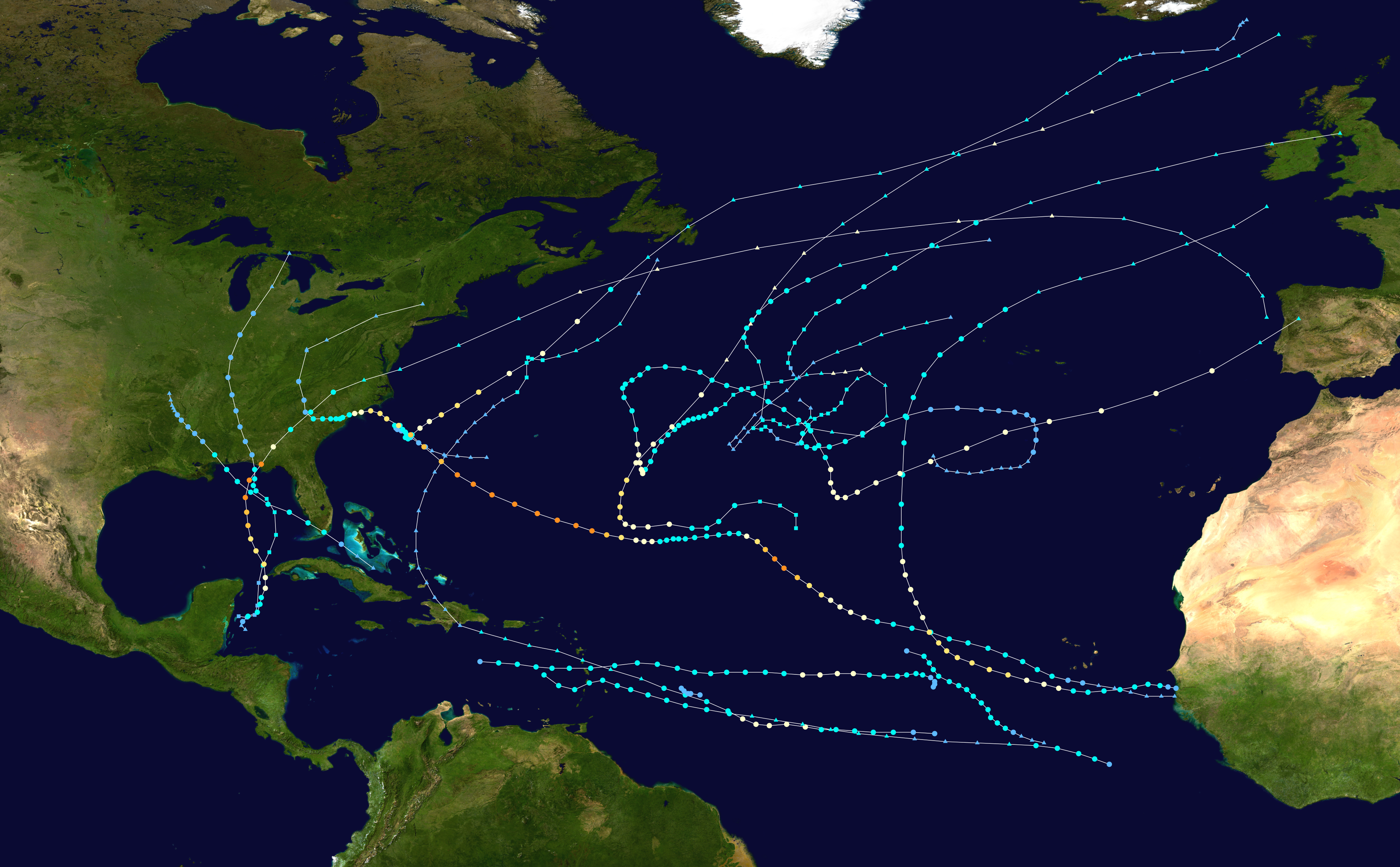
2018 Atlantic Ocean hurricane season summary map

The 2018 Atlantic hurricane season was the third in a consecutive series of above-average and damaging Atlantic hurricane seasons, featuring fifteen named storms, eight hurricanes, and two major hurricanes, (Note: A major hurricane is a storm that ranks as Category 3 or higher on the Saffir–Simpson hurricane wind scale.) which caused a total of over $50 billion (2018 USD) in damages and at least 172 deaths.

The season began with the formation of Tropical Storm Alberto on May 25, marking the fourth consecutive year that activity began early. However, no storms developed in the month of June. July saw the formation of Beryl and Chris, both of which intensified into hurricanes. August also featured two named storms, Debby and Ernesto, though neither strengthened further than tropical storm status. On August 31, the depression that would later become Hurricane Florence developed. September featured the most activity, with Florence, Gordon, Helene, Isaac, Joyce, Tropical Depression Eleven, Kirk, and Leslie also forming or existing in the month. Florence, Helene, Isaac, and Joyce existed simultaneously for a few days in September, becoming the first time since 2008 that four named storms were active at the same time. The season also became the second consecutive year with three hurricanes simultaneously active.

Activity continued in October, with Michael forming on October 7 and strengthening into a major hurricane over the Gulf of Mexico before making landfall in the Florida Panhandle at peak intensity. Michael, which peaked as a Category 5 hurricane with maximum sustained winds of 160 miles per hour (260 km/h) and a minimum barometric pressure of 919 mbar (27.1 inHg), was the most intense tropical cyclone of the season and one of only four storms to make landfall in the United States mainland as a Category 5, the others being the 1935 Labor Day hurricane, Hurricane Camille in 1969, and Hurricane Andrew in 1992. After 15 consecutive days as a tropical cyclone, Leslie transitioned into a powerful extratropical cyclone on October 13 while situated approximately 120 mi (195 km) west of the Iberian Peninsula, before making landfall soon afterward. A two-week period of inactivity ensued as the season began to wind down. Oscar, forming as a subtropical storm on October 26, intensified into a hurricane the next day, making it the eighth hurricane of the season. Oscar's extratropical transition ended the season's activity on October 31. No systems formed in the month of November for the first time since 2014.

The seasonal activity was reflected with an accumulated cyclone energy index value of 133 units. ACE is, broadly speaking, a measure of the power of a hurricane multiplied by the length of time it existed; therefore, long-lived storms and particularly strong systems result in high levels of ACE. The measure is calculated at full advisories for cyclones at tropical storm strength—storms with winds in excess of 39 miles per hour (63 km/h).

=== Eastern Pacific & Central Pacific Oceans ===
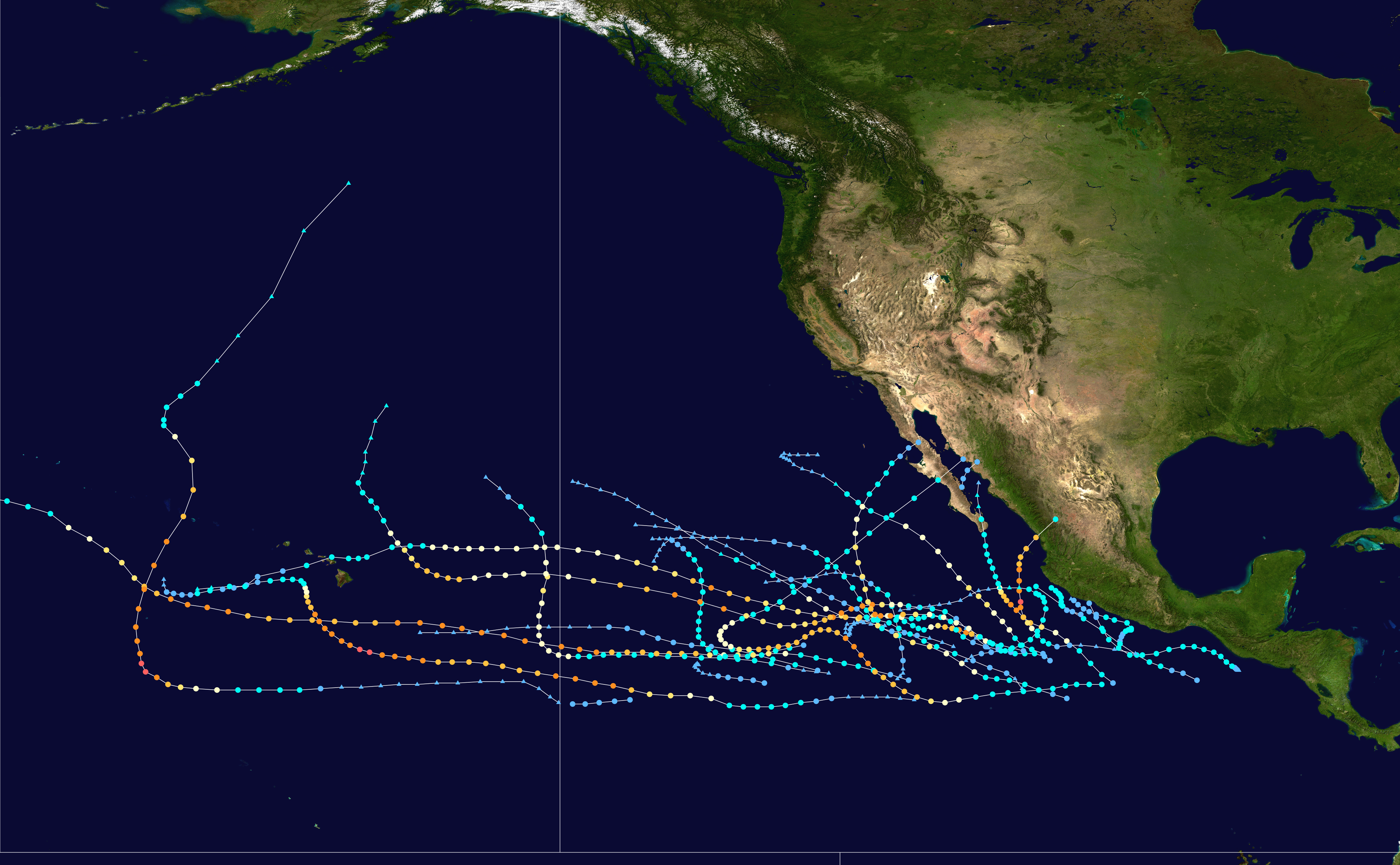
2018 Pacific hurricane season summary map

The 2018 Pacific hurricane season was one of the most active Pacific hurricane seasons on record, producing the highest accumulated cyclone energy value on record in the basin. The season had the fourth-highest number of named storms—23, tied with 1982. The season also featured eight landfalls, six of which occurred in Mexico. The season produced 26 tropical depressions formed, with 23 reaching tropical storm intensity. Thirteen of the tropical storms became hurricanes, with 10 reaching major hurricane intensity. The accumulated cyclone energy (ACE) index for the 2018 Pacific hurricane season was 316.565 units (201.9725 units for the Eastern Pacific and 114.5925 units for the Central Pacific).

The season started with the formation of Tropical Depression One-E on May 10, which was five days before the official start of hurricane season in the Eastern Pacific. The month of June saw record activity, with the formation of six tropical cyclones – Aletta, Bud, Carlotta, Daniel, Emilia, and Seven-E. With five named systems, the record for most June tropical storms, which was set in 1985, was tied. Aletta and Bud both intensified into Category 4 major hurricanes, marking the first time since 2010 that two occurred in June. Tropical Storm Carlotta moved along the southern coast of Mexico, causing flooding rains. Activity during the month of July was below normal across the basin. Although a total of four tropical depressions formed, only two became storms – Fabio and Gilma. Fabio's intensification into a tropical storm on July 1 marked the earliest date of a season's sixth named storm, beating the previous record of July 3 set in both 1984 and 1985.

August was an above-average month for the Eastern Pacific, with a total of seven named storms occurring during the month – Hector, Ileana, John, Kristy, Lane, Miriam, and Norman. Forming from a July tropical depression, Hurricane Hector spent more days as a major hurricane than any other storm in the basin. It also had the highest accumulated cyclone energy since Hurricane John in 1994. Around the same time, Tropical Storm Ileana paralleled the southwestern coast of Mexico, bringing heavy rainfall to the region. Forming in mid-August, Hurricane Lane became the first Category 5 hurricane to form during the year. Lane brought record rainfall to Hawaii's Big Island, becoming the wettest tropical cyclone for that state and the second wettest in the United States. September saw the formation of five tropical cyclones – Olivia, Paul, Nineteen-E, Rosa, and Sergio. Hurricane Olivia became the first tropical cyclone in recorded history to make landfall on the islands of Maui and Lanai on September 12. Tropical Depression Nineteen-E formed in the Gulf of California on September 19, the first such instance in recorded history. It made landfall in Sonora on the next day, causing severe flooding. Additionally, one named storm formed in the Central Pacific in September – Walaka. In October, Walaka intensified into a Category 5 hurricane in the Central Pacific – the season's second Category 5 storm.

October yielded an above-average number of tropical cyclones with three named storms forming – Tara, Vicente, and Willa. Sergio became the eighth system to obtain Category 4 intensity during the season, breaking the old record of seven which was set in 2015. Rosa and Sergio both made landfall on the Baja California Peninsula during October, bringing gale-force winds and rain to the region before impacting western Mexico. Willa became the season's third and last Category 5 hurricane before making landfall in Sinaloa, Mexico, in late October. The cyclone brought strong winds to the area where it made landfall and dropped torrential rainfall throughout the region. Tropical Storm Vicente caused severe flooding and landslides in western Mexico at the same time as Willa, compounding the latter's effects in some areas. November featured the season's last system, Tropical Storm Xavier, which dissipated on November 6, marking the end of the season.

=== Western Pacific Ocean ===
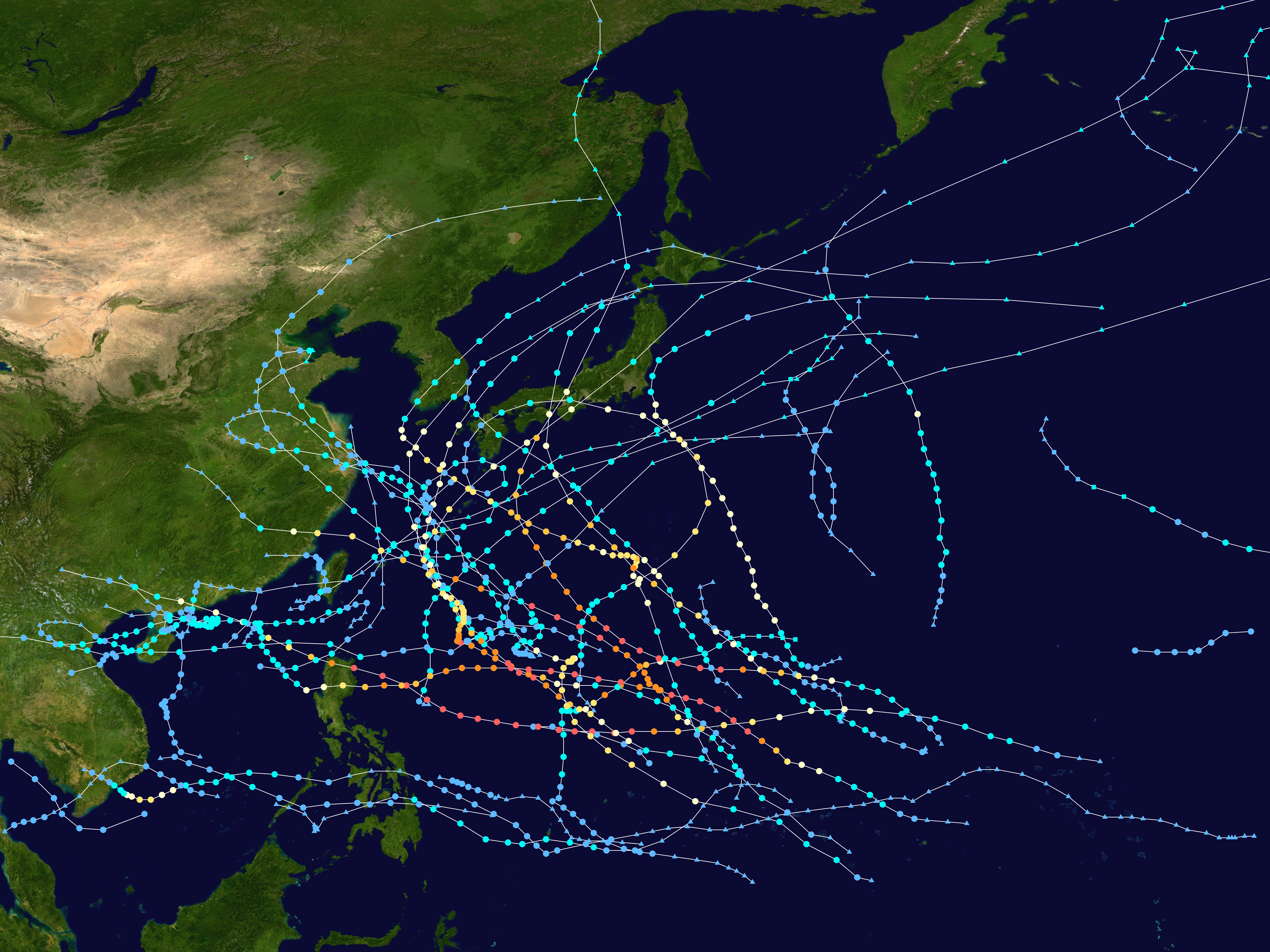
2018 Pacific typhoon season summary map

The 2018 Pacific typhoon season was the costliest Pacific typhoon season on record, until the record was beaten by the following year. The season was above-average, producing 29 storms, 13 typhoons, and 7 super typhoons.

The season began with Tropical Depression Agaton active to the east of the Philippines. Over the course of two days, the system moved over to the South China Sea and intensified into the first named storm, Bolaven. A month later, Tropical Storm Sanba developed and affected the southern Philippines. About another month later, Tropical Depression 03W formed in the open Pacific and was named Jelawat. Jelawat intensified into the season's first typhoon on March 30 and then the season's first super typhoon. Tropical activity fired up by June, when a series of storms developed, with Tropical Storm Ewiniar making landfall over mainland China. Later that month, Typhoon Prapiroon developed and affected the Korean Peninsula, the first since 2013. Thereafter, Typhoon Maria developed and reached its peak intensity as a Category 5 super typhoon, being the first typhoon to reach that intensity since Typhoon Nock-ten in 2016. Hurricane Hector crossed the International Date Line on August 13, the first to do so since Genevieve in 2014. Systems like Tropical Storms Son-tinh, Ampil, Josie, Wukong, Jongdari, Shanshan, Yagi, Leepi, Bebinca, and Rumbia formed between late July and early August.

On August 16, Typhoon Soulik developed and headed north until a Fujiwhara interaction with Typhoon Cimaron (which formed later than Soulik) made it head west towards the East China Sea. It later made landfall in South Korea, making it the first typhoon to make landfall in South Korea since Typhoon Chaba in 2016. Cimaron made landfall near Kyoto, Japan, on August 23. When Cimaron was nearing landfall, Tropical Depression Luis formed, which made landfall in China and Taiwan. Later that month, Typhoon Jebi developed over the West Pacific and intensified into the third super typhoon of the season.

In September, Typhoon Mangkhut became the fourth super typhoon of the season and made landfall on the island of Luzon in the Philippines. On the same day, Tropical Depression Neneng formed, which later became Tropical Storm Barijat and made landfall in Vietnam. By late September, Typhoon Trami (Paeng) formed, becoming the 5th super typhoon of 2018. While Typhoon Trami was in the Western Pacific, nearing Okinawa with winds of 165 kilometres per hour (103 mph), Tropical Depression 30W formed and was named Kong-rey by the JMA after strengthening into a tropical storm. It intensified into a super typhoon on October 2, becoming the 5th Category 5 super typhoon. Later on in the month, it was followed by the sixth and final Category 5-equivalent storm of the season, Yutu.

=== North Indian Ocean ===
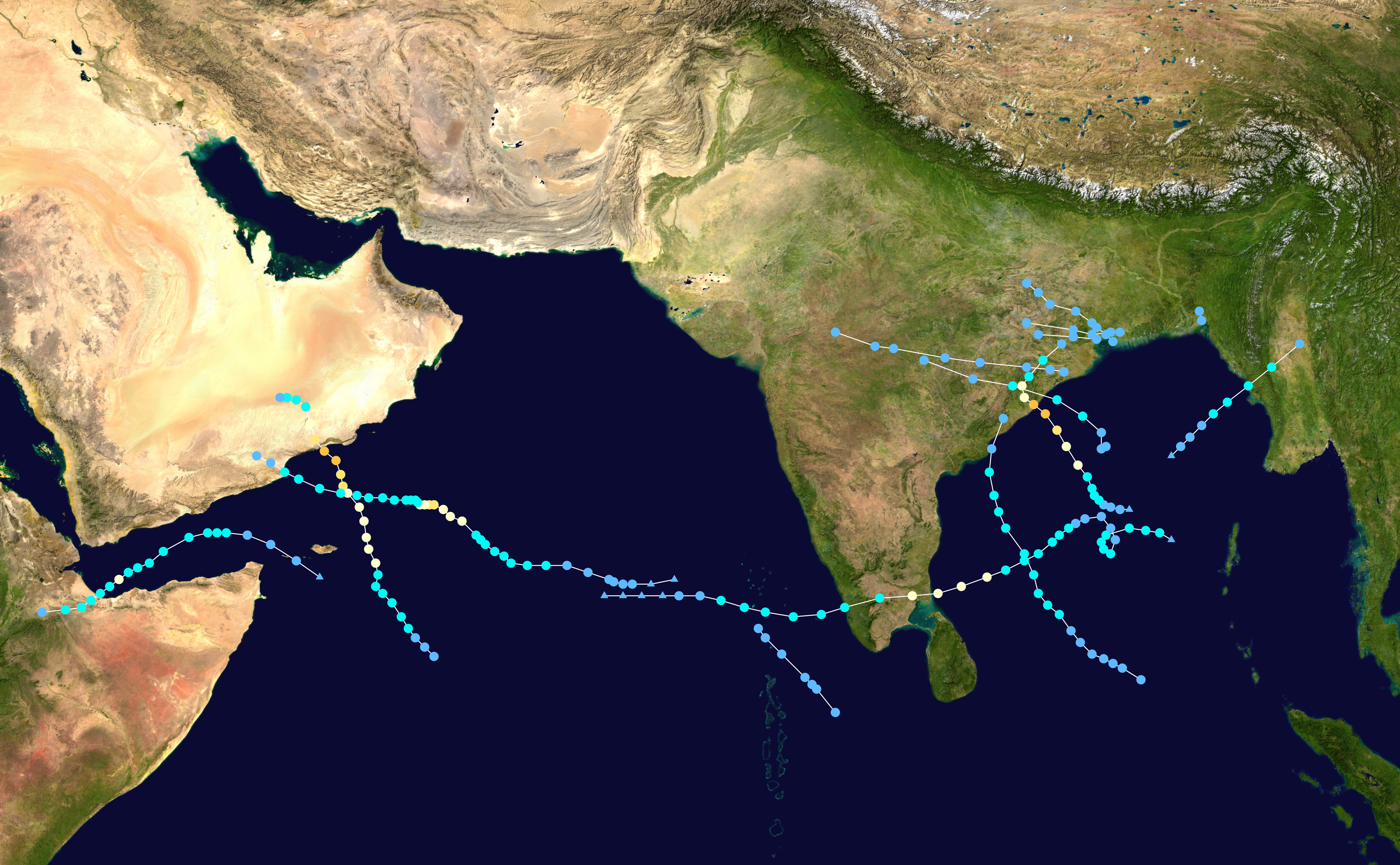
2018 North Indian Ocean cyclone season summary map

The 2018 North Indian Ocean cyclone season was one of the most active North Indian Ocean cyclone seasons since 1992, with the formation of fourteen depressions and seven cyclones.

The season started with ARB 01, which was formed on March 14, making it one of the rarest systems formed in March since tropical cyclone development stays relatively low between January and March. It caused heavy rainfall in the Maldives, Lakshadweep, and Kerala. After a two-month gap, another low formed near the Horn of Africa, which later became Sagar. It became unofficially the strongest cyclone to make landfall until it was broken by Gati in 2020. It caused heavy rainfall in Somaliland, and local flooding was reported on the Yemeni coast. The storm made the westernmost landfall, surpassing the record of Tropical Storm One. A day after Sagar's dissipation, another low pressure formed off the coast of Oman, which later organized into Cyclone Mekunu. It then peaked as a Category 3 tropical cyclone according to the JTWC and an Extremely Severe Cyclonic Storm according to the IMD. It caused 30 people to die, and heavy rainfall was recorded in Salalah, Oman. After that, a low pressure quickly intensified into a deep depression and peaked as a tropical storm made landfall in Myanmar, causing heavy downpours. Five monsoonal depressions also formed between June and September.

Cyclogenesis continued with Cyclone Daye, which made landfall in the Odisha state. A heavy downpour and flood mainly in the Malkangiri district and its outer bands also caused heavy rainfall in West Bengal. Following Daye, Luban and Titli both formed in the Arabian Sea and the Bay of Bengal, respectively, causing heavy damage in Oman and Andhra Pradesh. Gaja, on November 10, also formed and caused extensive damage in Tamil Nadu and the Andaman and Nicobar Islands. The season ended with Cyclone Phethai causing agricultural damage in Andhra Pradesh and eight dead.

=== South-West Indian Ocean ===
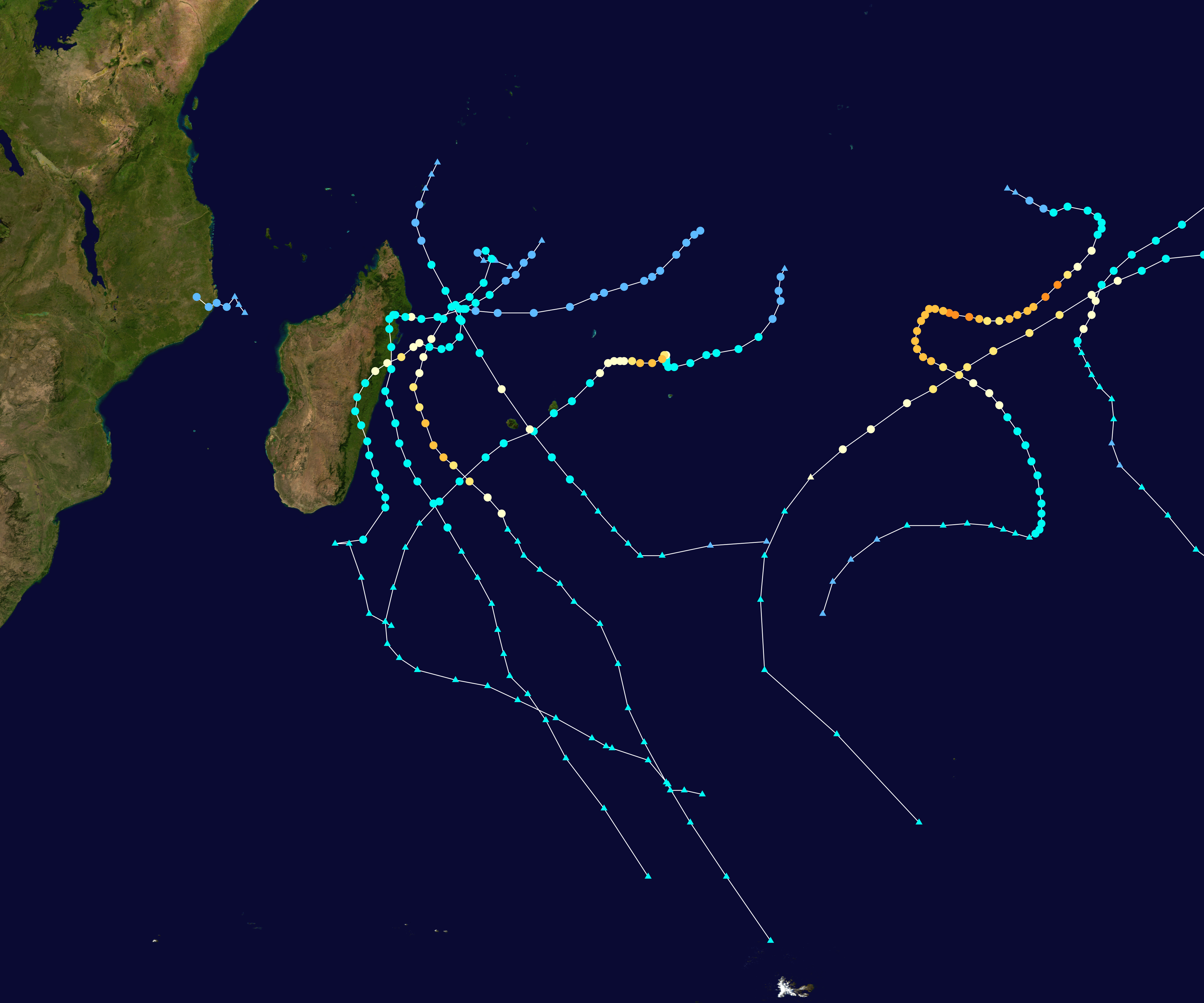
2017–18 South-West Indian Ocean cyclone season summary map

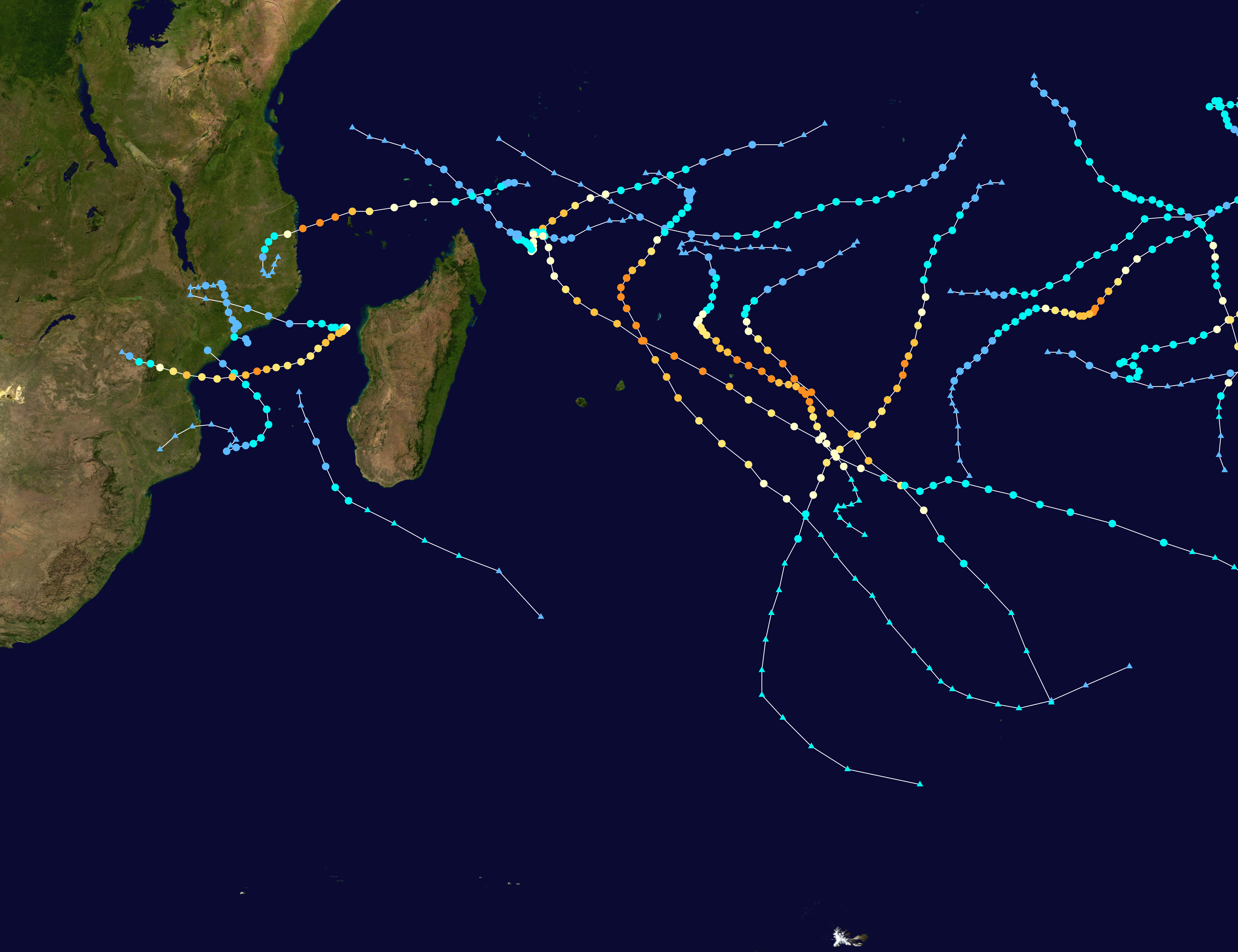
2018–19 South-West Indian Ocean cyclone season summary map

==== January–June ====
The 2017–18 season was a below-average season that produced only 8 tropical storms, of which 6 became tropical cyclones.

The season started with Tropical Depression 01U, which was designated by the BOM and entered the basin on August 8; however, it quickly dissipated overseas. After a three-month gap another low formed off the coast of Madagascar on December 27, which intensified into Tropical Cyclone Ava. It caused powerful winds up to 190 km/h (120 mph) and caused extensive damage in Toamasina, and heavy downpours triggered flash flooding in Tamatave and ⁣⁣Antananarivo⁣⁣. After that, another low formed in the Australian region and entered the basin. It was named Irving by the Bureau of Meteorology and peaked as a powerful Category 2 equivalent tropical cyclone. It dissipated off the coast of Madagascar. A day later, after Ava and Irving, a low pressure formed near Mauritius and explosively intensified into a powerful Category 3 equivalent tropical cyclone named Berguitta. It passed near Mauritius, and strong winds affected the textile industry; it then passed 50 km (31 mi) southeast of Réunion, and strong winds knocked down power lines and trees and left 72,000 people without power. Following Berguitta, a tropical depression formed northeast of Madagascar and caused a heavy downpour; damage is unknown; however, MFR gave advisories.

Five days after Berguitta's dissipation, another tropical depression formed on January 25. It then peaked as a very powerful Category 4 equivalent tropical cyclone named Cebile; however, no advisories were given by MFR and JTWC because it was formed overseas. A month after Cebile, a tropical depression formed near the coast of Madagascar, which was then named Dumazile. It peaked as a category 3 equivalent tropical cyclone and caused agricultural damage in Reunion Island. A week after Dumazile's dissipation, another low pressure formed off the east coast of Madagascar. It caused a heavy downpour, which destroyed 260 homes, and flash flooding caused an additional 630 homes to be destroyed; its remnants affected Reunion. A month later, Fakir formed east of Réunion and dumped 415 mm (16.3 in) of rainfall, which triggered a landslide and took two people's lives. The season ended with Flamboyan, which was the first system to be named by TCWC Jakarta; it peaked as a Category 1 equivalent tropical cyclone and dissipated on May 1 without making landfall.

==== July–December ====
The 2018–19 season was the costliest and the most active season ever recorded since reliable records began in 1967. Additionally, it is also the deadliest cyclone season recorded in the South-West Indian Ocean, surpassing the 1891–92 season, in which the 1892 Mauritius cyclone devastated the island of Mauritius.

The first tropical cyclone was an unnamed moderate tropical storm that formed northeast of Madagascar on September 13, 2018, two months before the official start of the season. Two cyclones formed in the month of November, with Intense Tropical Cyclone Alcide forming on November 5, and Severe Tropical Storm Bouchra entering the basin from the Australian region on November 9. Two tropical cyclones formed in the month of December, Cilida and Kenanga. Intense Tropical Cyclone Kenanga crossed into the basin from the Australian region, retaining its name assigned by TCWC Jakarta. Two moderate tropical storms formed in January, Desmond and Eketsang. Five more intense tropical cyclones formed during February and March: Funani, Gelena, Haleh, Idai, and Joaninha. In addition, Savannah crossed into the basin from the Australian basin as an intense tropical cyclone in March. On April 21, 2019, final two storms of the season formed at the same time, Kenneth and Lorna.

== Systems ==
=== January ===
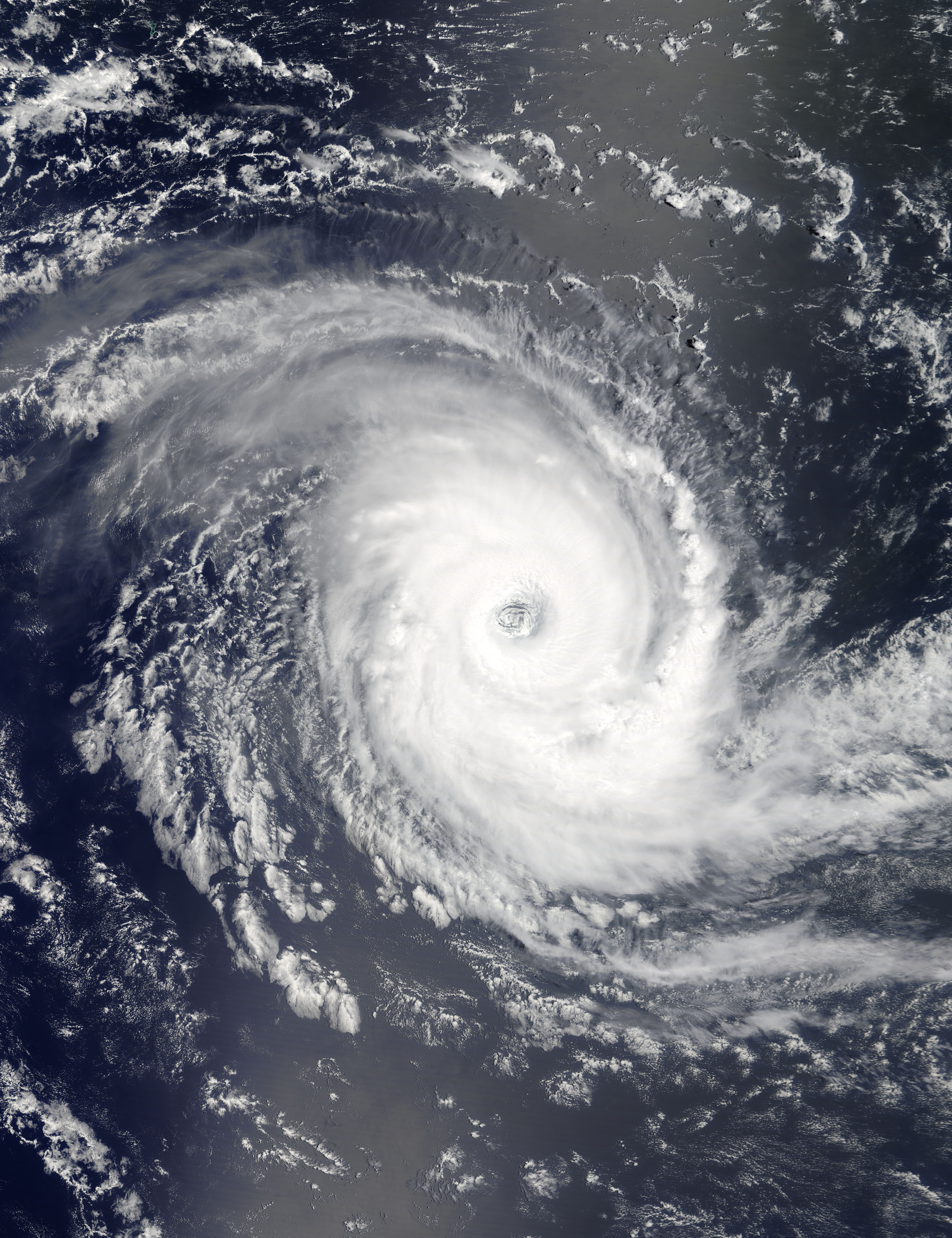
Cyclone Cebile

A total of thirteen tropical systems of all intensities were monitored during January 2018, of which seven developed further and were named by the various warning centres. As the year opened a tropical depression that was being monitored by the JMA within the Western Pacific, while a weak tropical low existed within the Australian region to the south of Sumatra. During that day, the depression entered PAGASA's self-defined area of responsibility, where it was assigned the name Agaton. In the middle of the month, Cyclone Berguitta passed very close to Mauritius and Réunion, causing millions in damages and a fatality. The only system to cause significant damage was Tropical Cyclone Fehi which caused tens of millions in damages when it brought severe flooding to New Zealand in late January.

Tropical cyclones formed in January 2018
Storm name	Dates active	Max wind km/h (mph)	Pressure (hPa)	Areas affected	Damage (USD)	Deaths	Refs
07U	January 1–2	N/A	1006	None	None	None	
Irving	January 3–9	150 (90)	964	None	None	None	
Joyce	January 7–16	85 (50)	978	Western Australia	None	None	
Berguitta	January 9–20	165 (105)	940	Mauritius, Réunion	$26.5 million	1	
04	January 14–16	55 (35)	999	Madagascar, Mozambique	$5.1 million	11	
10U	January 14–19	Unspecified	Unspecified	Christmas Island	None	None	
11U	January 20–February 1	75 (45)	985	Top End, Western Australia		None	None
12U	January 23–24	Unspecified	Unspecified	None	None	None	
Cebile	January 25–February 4	185 (115)	944	None	None	None	
05F	January 26–27	Unspecified	996	New Caledonia	None	None	
Fehi	January 28–30	85 (50)	986	New Caledonia, New Zealand	$67 million	None	

=== February ===
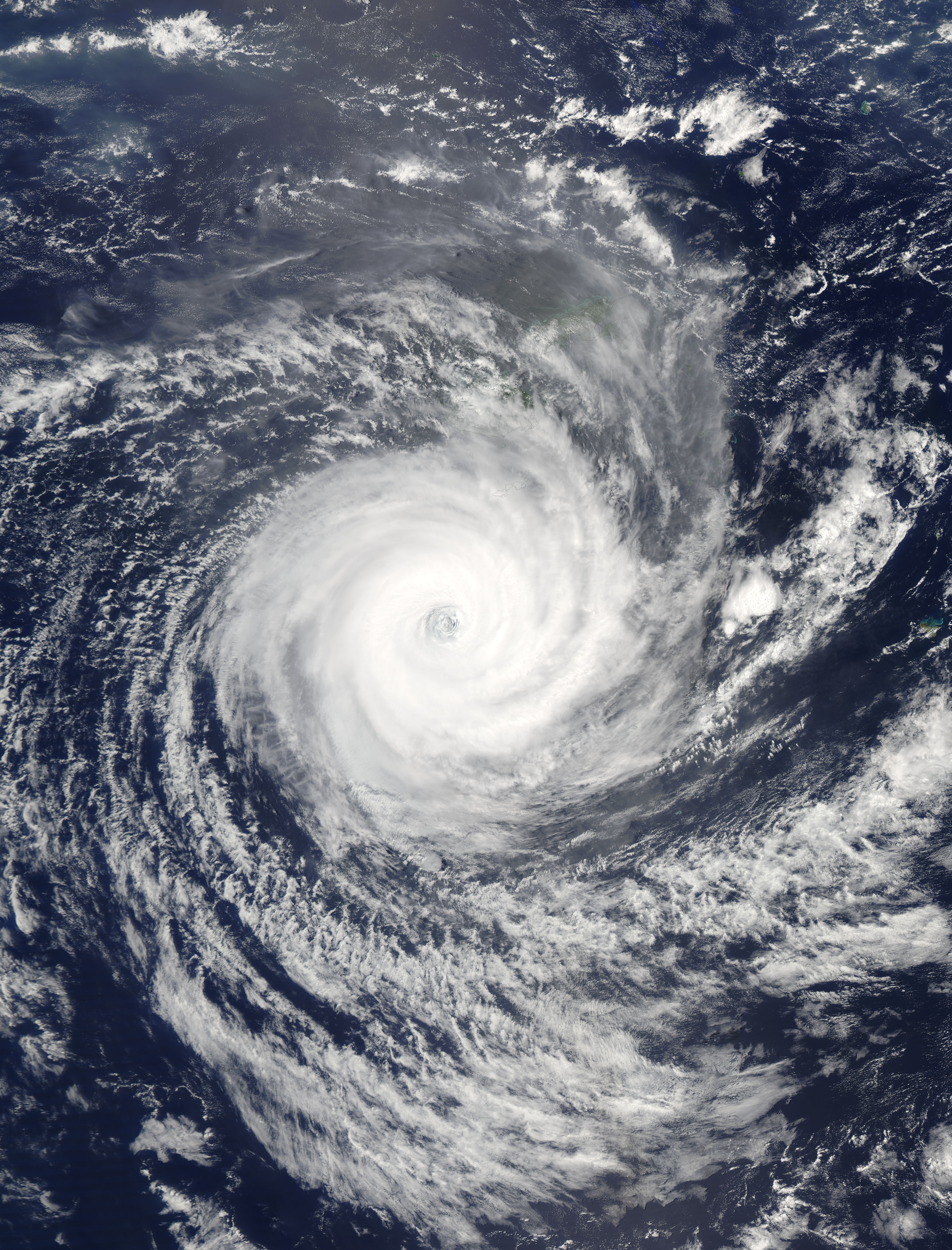
Cyclone Gita

The month of February was inactive, with only six tropical cyclones forming. However, Cyclone Gita became the most intense tropical cyclone to affect Tonga since records began. Gita was also one of the worst tropical cyclones to affect the island nation, causing significant agricultural and structural damages totalling in the hundreds of millions as well as a couple fatalities. Tropical Storm Sanba was a system that made landfall in the Philippines, resulting in a few million in damage and over a dozen fatalities. Cyclone Kelvin was unusual in that it maintained a healthy structure over land through a process known as the brown ocean effect, leading to tens of millions in damages.

Tropical cyclones formed in February 2018
Storm name	Dates active	Max wind km/h (mph)	Pressure (hPa)	Areas affected	Damage (USD)	Deaths	Refs
14U	February 1	Unspecified	Unspecified	None	None	None	
Gita	February 3–19	205 (125)	927	Vanuatu, Fiji, Wallis and Futuna, Samoa, American Samoa, Niue, Tonga, New Caledonia, Queensland, New Zealand	$250 million	2	
08F	February 3–11	Unspecified	994	Fiji	None	None	
Sanba (Basyang)	February 8–16	65 (40)	1000	Caroline Islands, Philippines	$3.23 million	15	
15U	February 9–12	Unspecified	Unspecified	None	None	None	
Kelvin	February 11–20	150 (90)	955	Top End, Western Australia, South Australia	$25 million	None	

=== March ===
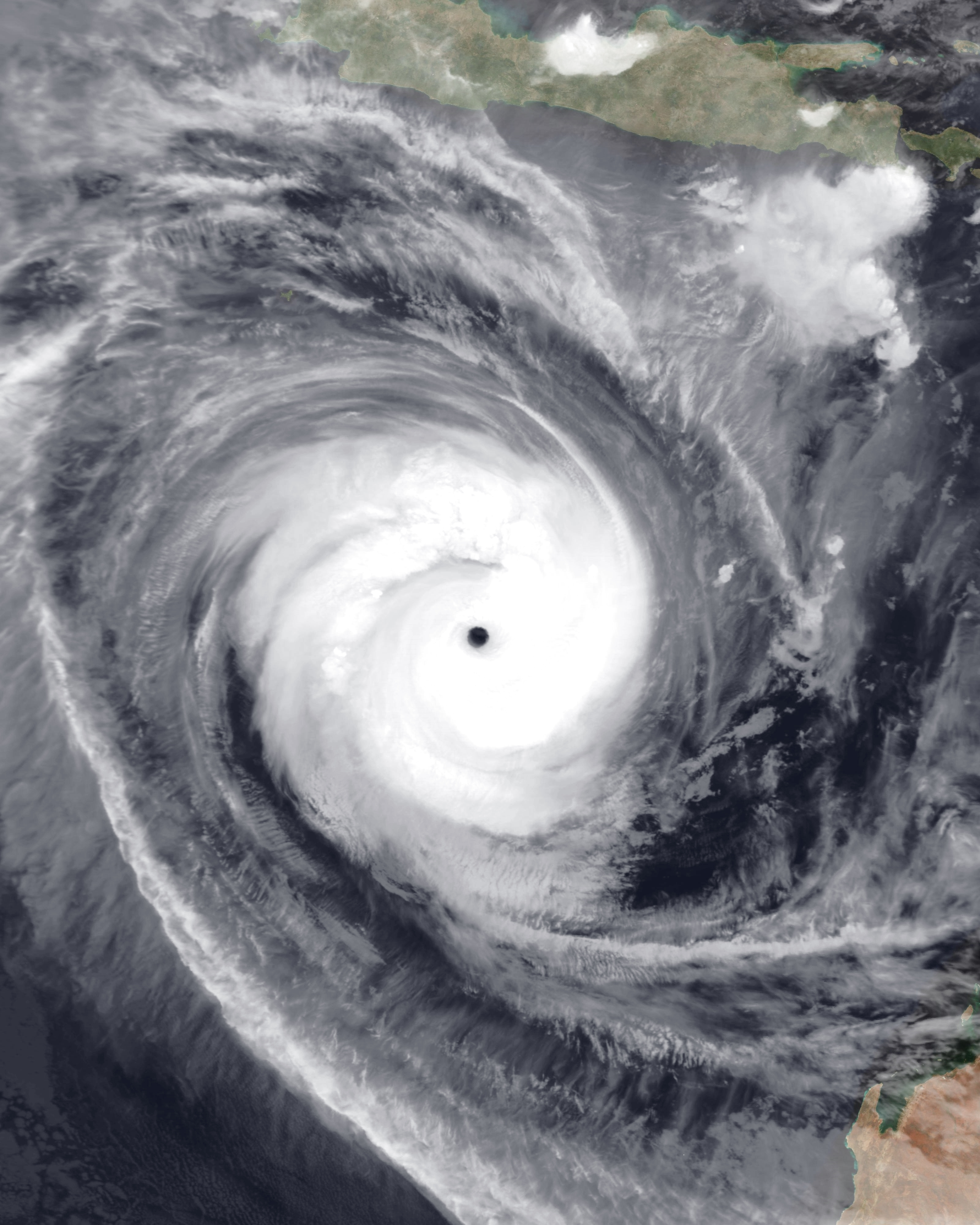
Cyclone Marcus

March was an active month with twelve systems. Early in the month, Cyclone Hola formed near Vanuatu causing a few fatalities and later passed by New Caledonia and New Zealand where it caused minor damages. At the same time, Tropical Depression 18U made landfall in Northern Territory, causing tens of millions in damage despite being a weak system. In the middle of the month, Cyclone Eliakim made landfall in Madagascar, causing close to two dozen deaths and an unknown amount of damage. Also forming in the middle of month, Cyclone Marcus was a very intense tropical cyclone that affected the Tanimbar Islands, Top End, and Kimberley, causing tens of millions in damages. Cyclone Iris was a very long lived system that formed several days later, lasting for nearly four weeks as a tropical cyclone before dissipating in mid-April. Cyclone Josie was a system that formed in late March. It affected southern Fiji, causing millions in damages and several deaths.

Tropical cyclones formed in March 2018
Storm name	Dates active	Max wind km/h (mph)	Pressure (hPa)	Areas affected	Damage (USD)	Deaths	Refs
Dumazile	March 1–6	165 (105)	945	Madagascar, Réunion	None	None	
Hola	March 3–11	165 (105)	952	Vanuatu, New Caledonia, New Zealand	Unknown	3	
18U	March 4–9	Unspecified	1001	Northern Territory	$40 million	None	
Eliakim	March 13–20	110 (70)	980	Madagascar	$3.21 million	21	
Linda	March 13–16	75 (45)	993	Solomon Islands, New Caledonia, South East Queensland	None	None	
ARB 01	March 13–15	45 (30)^{3}	1006	South India, Maldives	None	None	
Marcus	March 14–24	250 (155)	905	Tanimbar Islands, Top End, Kimberley	$75 million	None	
Nora	March 20–26	155 (100)	958	Cape York Peninsula, New Guinea, Top End	None	None	
Iris	March 20–April 9	100 (65)	987	None	None	None	
23U	March 23–25	Unspecified	1004	None	None	None	
Jelawat (Caloy)	March 24–April 1	195 (120)	915	Caroline Islands	Unknown	2	
Josie	March 29–April 2	75 (45)	993	Vanuatu, Fiji, Tonga	$10 million	6	

=== April ===
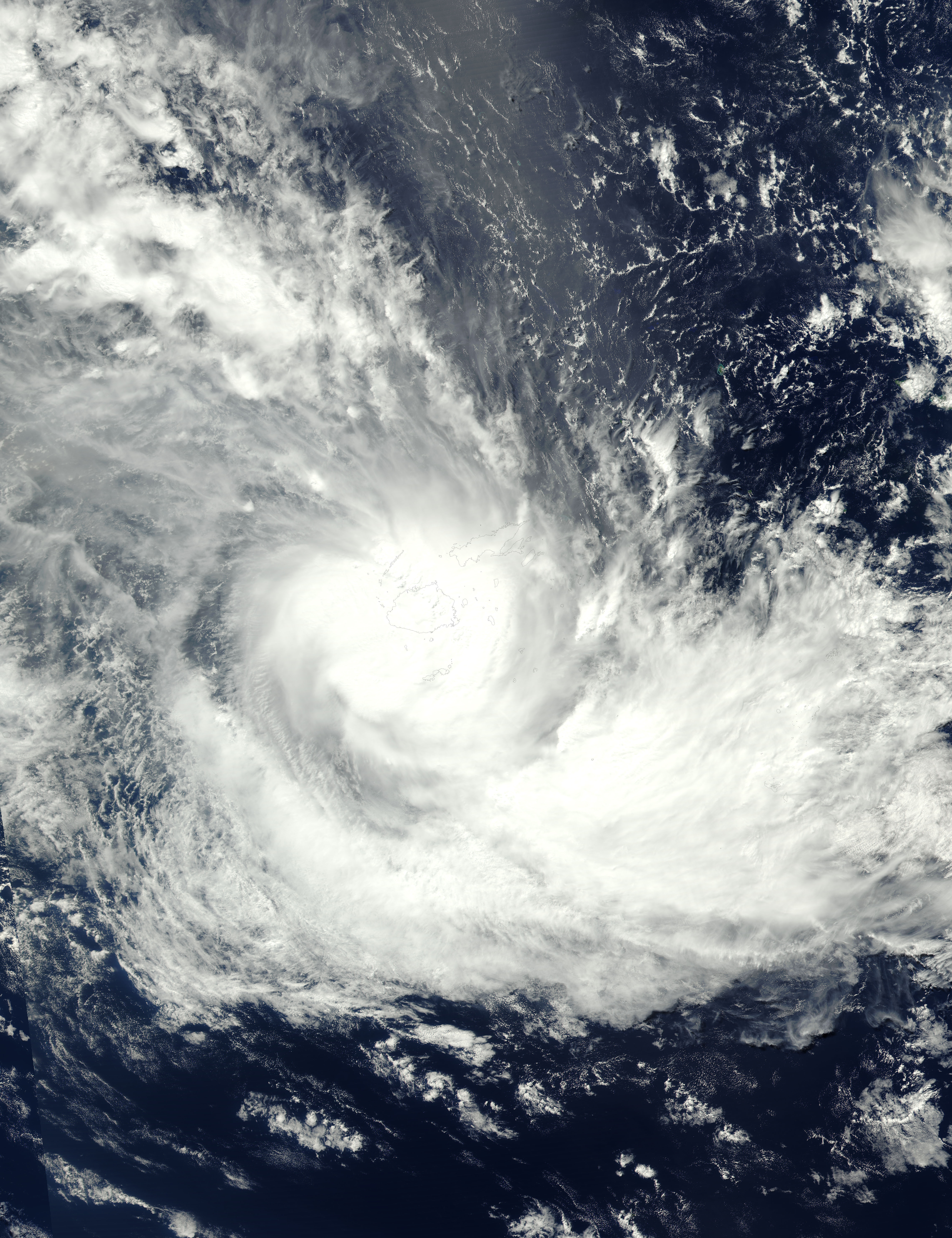
Cyclone Keni

April was an inactive month with only four systems forming. Tropical Cyclone Keni made landfall in Fiji, causing millions in damages. Later in the month, Tropical Cyclone Fakir passed by Réunion, causing millions in damages and a small number of fatalities.

Tropical cyclones formed in April 2018
Storm name	Dates active	Max wind km/h (mph)	Pressure (hPa)	Areas affected	Damage (USD)	Deaths	Refs
Keni	April 5–11	140 (85)	970	Vanuatu, Fiji, Tonga	$50 million	None	
14F	April 17–20	Unspecified	1000	Rotuma	None	None	
Fakir	April 20–24	130 (80)	975	Madagascar, Réunion, Mauritius	$24.5 million	2	
Flamboyan	April 26–May 1	110 (70)	983	None	None	None	

=== May ===
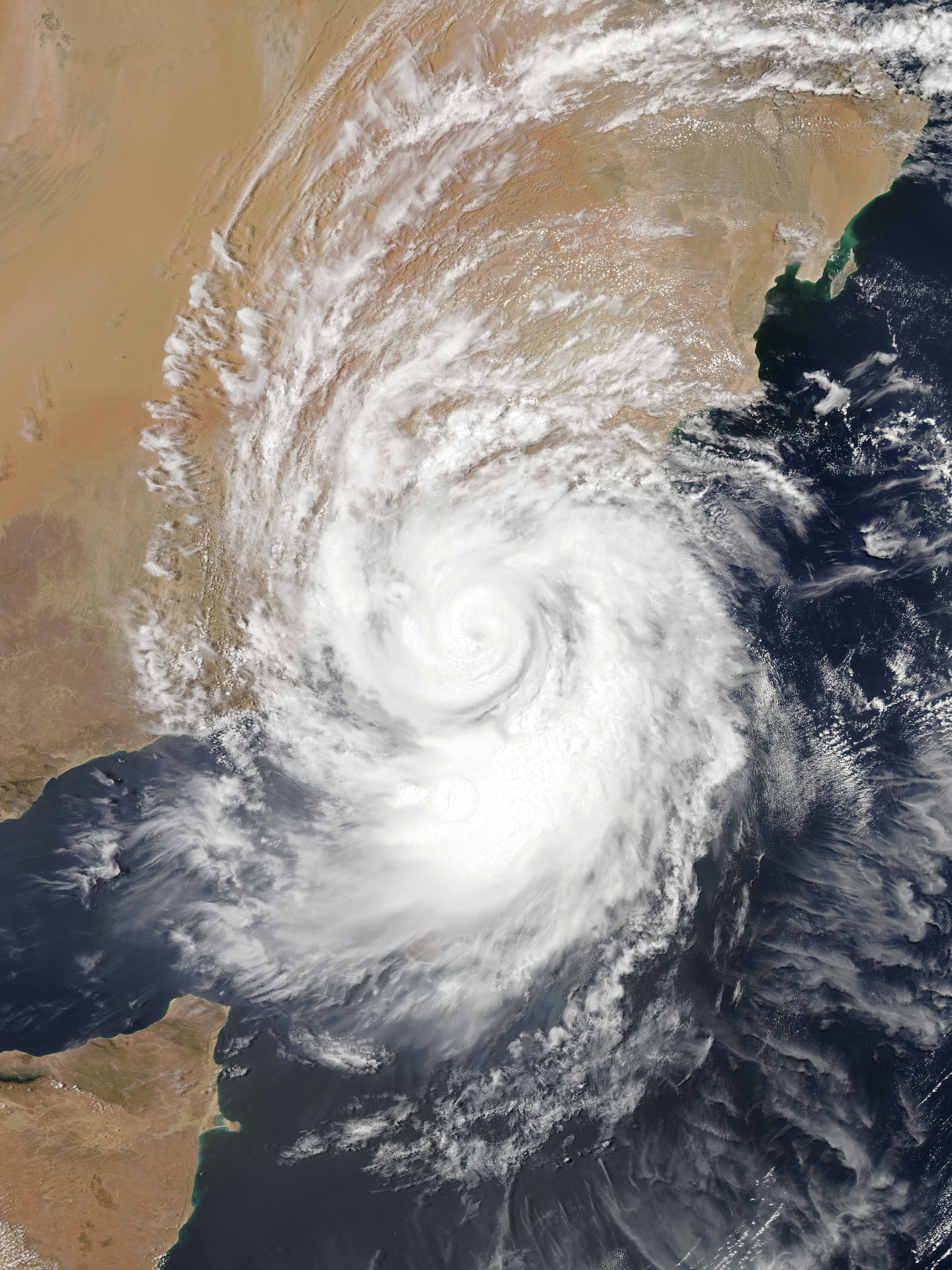
Cyclone Mekunu

May was a relatively active month with seven systems forming. In the middle of the month, Cyclone Sagar affected Yemen, Somalia, Djibouti, Ethiopia, causing tens of millions in damages and several dozen deaths. Several days later, Cyclone Mekunu affected Yemen, Oman, and Saudi Arabia, causing hundreds of millions in damages and close to a few dozen deaths. At the same time, Tropical Storm Alberto caused over a hundred million in damages and a dozen fatalities throughout the Northwest Caribbean and the Eastern United States. Late in the month, BOB 01 caused a few deaths in Myanmar.

Tropical cyclones formed in May 2018
Storm name	Dates active	Max wind km/h (mph)	Pressure (hPa)	Areas affected	Damage (USD)	Deaths	Refs
Lexi	May 4–9	75 (45)^{4}	988	Alejandro Selkirk Island, Juan Fernández Islands, Chile	None	None	
04W	May 10–15	Unspecified	1008	None	None	None	
One-E	May 10–11	55 (35)^{4}	1007	None	None	None	
Sagar	May 16–20	85 (50)^{3}	994	Yemen, Horn of Africa	$30 million	79	
Mekunu	May 21–27	175 (110)^{3}	960	Yemen, Oman, Saudi Arabia	$1.5 billion	31	
Alberto	May 25–31	100 (65)^{4}	990	Yucatán Peninsula, Cayman Islands, Cuba, Gulf Coast of the United States, Southeastern United States, Midwestern United States, Ontario	$125 million	18	
BOB 01	May 29–30	55 (35)^{3}	990	Myanmar	None	5	

=== June ===
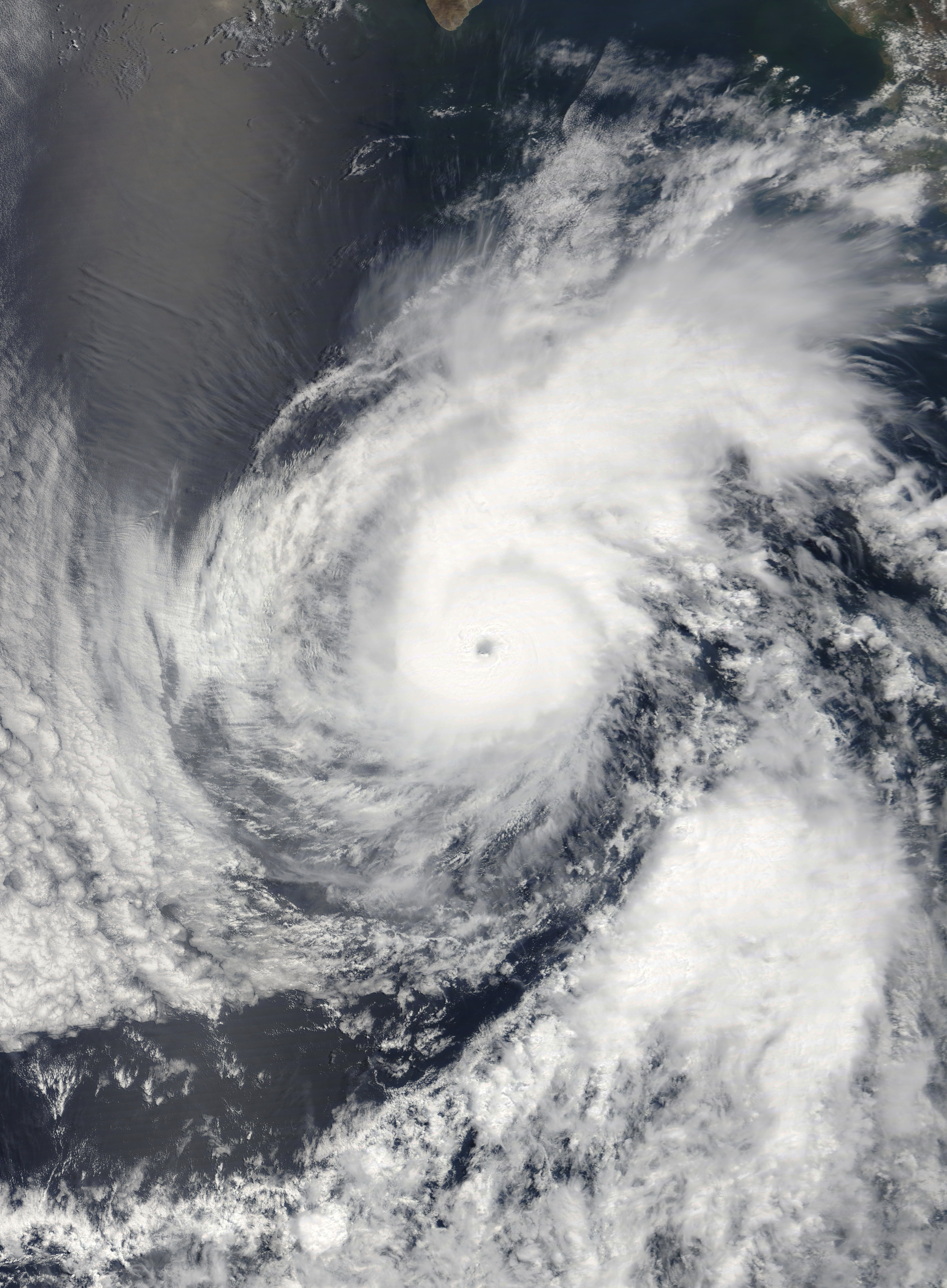
Hurricane Aletta

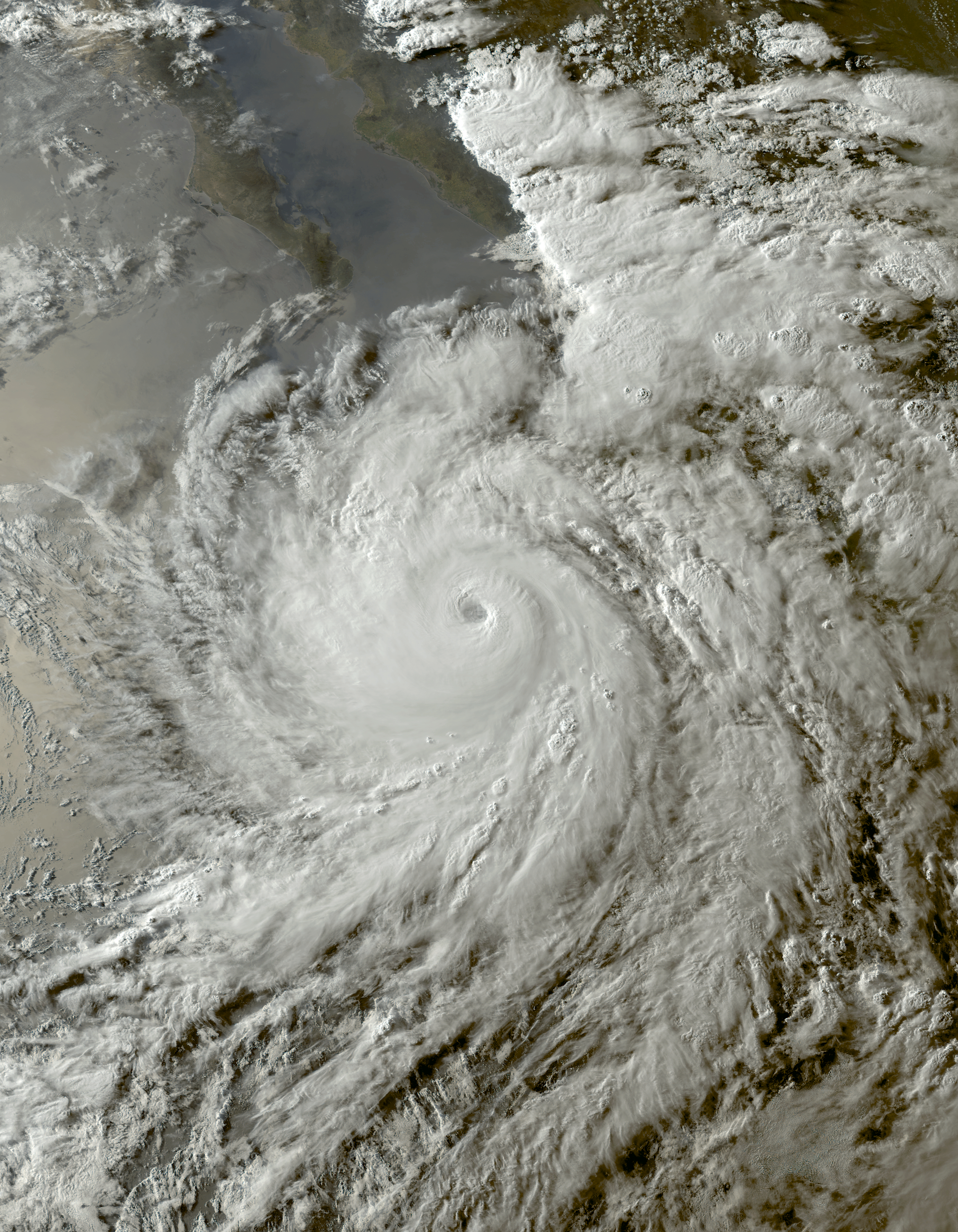
Hurricane Bud

June was an active month with fourteen systems having formed. In early June, Tropical Storm Ewiniar impacted South China and Vietnam, causing hundreds of millions in damages and over a dozen deaths. At the same time, Severe Tropical Storm Maliksi killed a couple people in the Philippines despite never making landfall. In the middle of the month, Tropical Storm Gaemi made landfall in Taiwan, causing a few fatalities. Late in the month, Prapiroon affected Japan and the Korean Peninsula, killing a few people and causing over ten million in damages.

Tropical cyclones formed in June 2018
Storm name	Dates active	Max wind km/h (mph)	Pressure (hPa)	Areas affected	Damage (USD)	Deaths	Refs
Ewiniar	June 2–9	75 (45)	998	Vietnam, Philippines, South China, Taiwan, Ryukyu Islands	$812 million	13	
Maliksi (Domeng)	June 3–11	110 (70)	970	Ryukyu Islands, Philippines, Honshu	None	2	
TD	June 4–5	Unspecified	1006	None	None	None	
Aletta	June 6–11	220 (140)^{4}	943	None	None	None	
Bud	June 9–15	220 (140)^{4}	943	Western Mexico, Baja California Sur, Southwestern United States	Minimal	None	
BOB 02	June 10–11	45 (30)^{3}	989	Bangladesh	None	None	
07W	June 13–15	65 (40)	996	Taiwan, Ryukyu Islands	None	None	
Gaemi (Ester)	June 13–16	85 (50)	990	Taiwan, Ryukyu Islands	None	3	
Carlotta	June 14–18	100 (65)^{4}	997	Southwestern Mexico	Unknown	None	
TD	June 17–18	Unspecified	1000	South China	None	None	
Daniel	June 24–26	75 (45)^{4}	1004	None	None	None	
Emilia	June 27–July 1	95 (60)^{4}	997	None	None	None	
Prapiroon (Florita)	June 28–July 4	120 (75)	960	Japan, Korean Peninsula	$10 million	4	
Fabio	June 30–July 6	175 (110)^{4}	964	None	None	None	

=== July ===
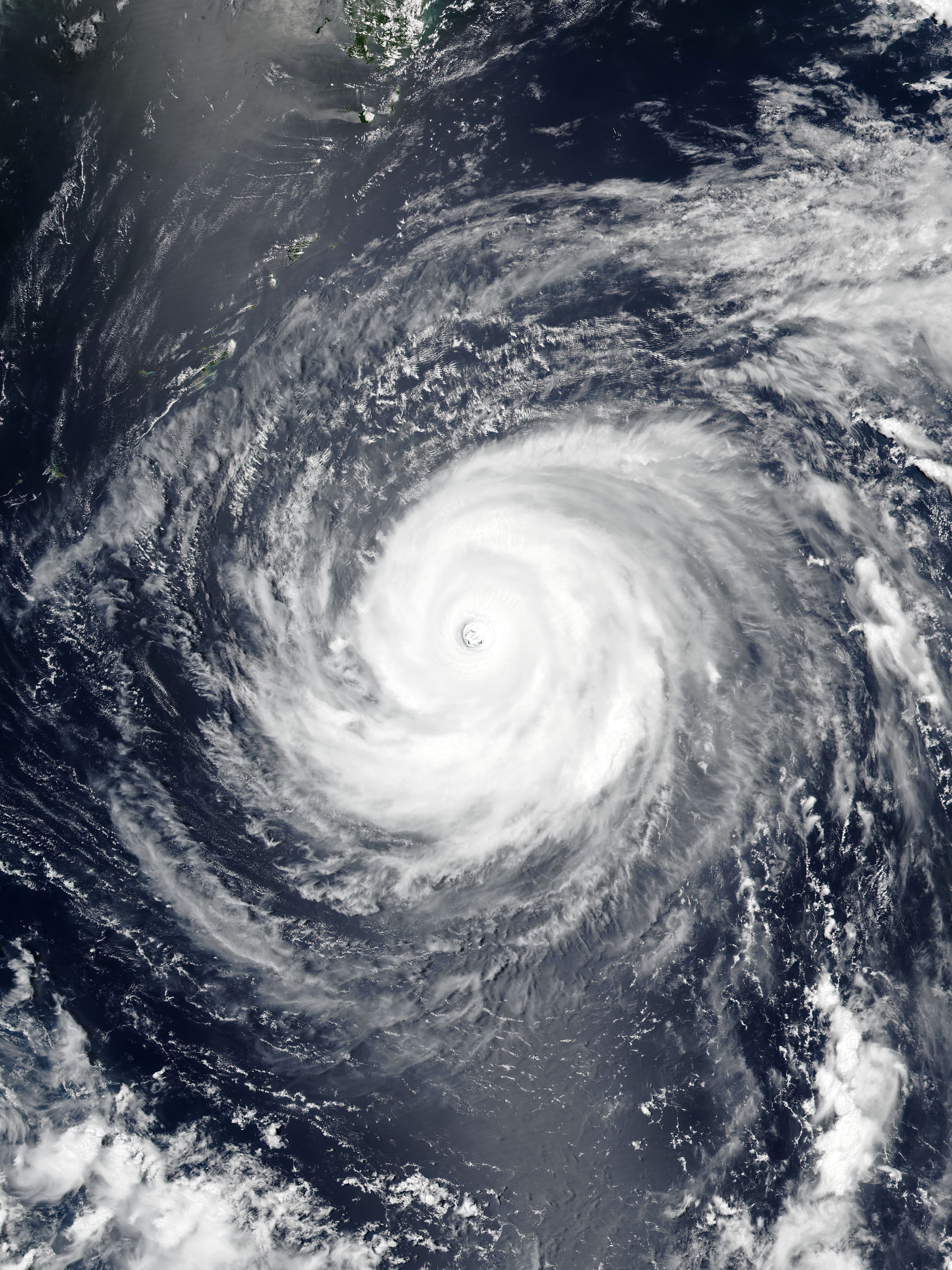
Typhoon Maria

July was an active month with fourteen systems having formed. In the middle of the month, Typhoon Maria caused a few hundred million in damages and a couple deaths in East China. Around the same time, Hurricane Chris killed a person off the coast of North Carolina. Later in the month, Tropical Storm Son-Tinh impacted the Philippines, South China, Vietnam, Laos, Thailand, and Myanmar, causing over a $235 million in damages and several dozen deaths.

Tropical cyclones formed in July 2018
Storm name	Dates active	Max wind km/h (mph)	Pressure (hPa)	Areas affected	Damage (USD)	Deaths	Refs
Maria (Gardo)	July 3–12	195 (120)	915	Mariana Islands, Ryukyu Islands, Taiwan, East China	$623 million	1	
Beryl	July 5–16	130 (80)^{4}	991	Lesser Antilles, Hispaniola, Puerto Rico, Cuba, The Bahamas, Bermuda, Atlantic Canada	Minimal	None	
Chris	July 6–12	165 (105)^{4}	969	Bermuda, East Coast of the United States, Atlantic Canada, Iceland	Minimal	1	
Son-Tinh (Henry)	July 16–24	75 (45)	994	Philippines, South China, Vietnam, Laos, Thailand, Myanmar	$256 million	170	
TD	July 16–17	Unspecified	998	South China, Vietnam, Laos	$14.9 million	None	
Ampil (Inday)	July 17–24	95 (60)	985	Ryukyu Islands, China, Russian Far East	$241 million	1	
13W (Josie)	July 20–23	55 (35)	996	Philippines, Taiwan, Ryukyu Islands, East China	$87.4 million	16	
BOB 03	July 21–23	45 (30)^{3}	989	East India, North India	Unknown	69	
Wukong	July 22–26	95 (60)	990	None	None	None	
Jongdari	July 23–August 4	140 (85)	960	Japan, East China	$1.48 billion	None	
Gilma	July 26–29	75 (45)^{4}	1005	None	None	None	
Nine-E	July 26–27	55 (35)^{4}	1007	None	None	None	
16W	July 31–August 1	55 (35)	1002	None	None	None	
Hector	July 31–August 16	250 (155)^{4}	936	Hawaii, Johnston Atoll	Minimal	None	

=== August ===
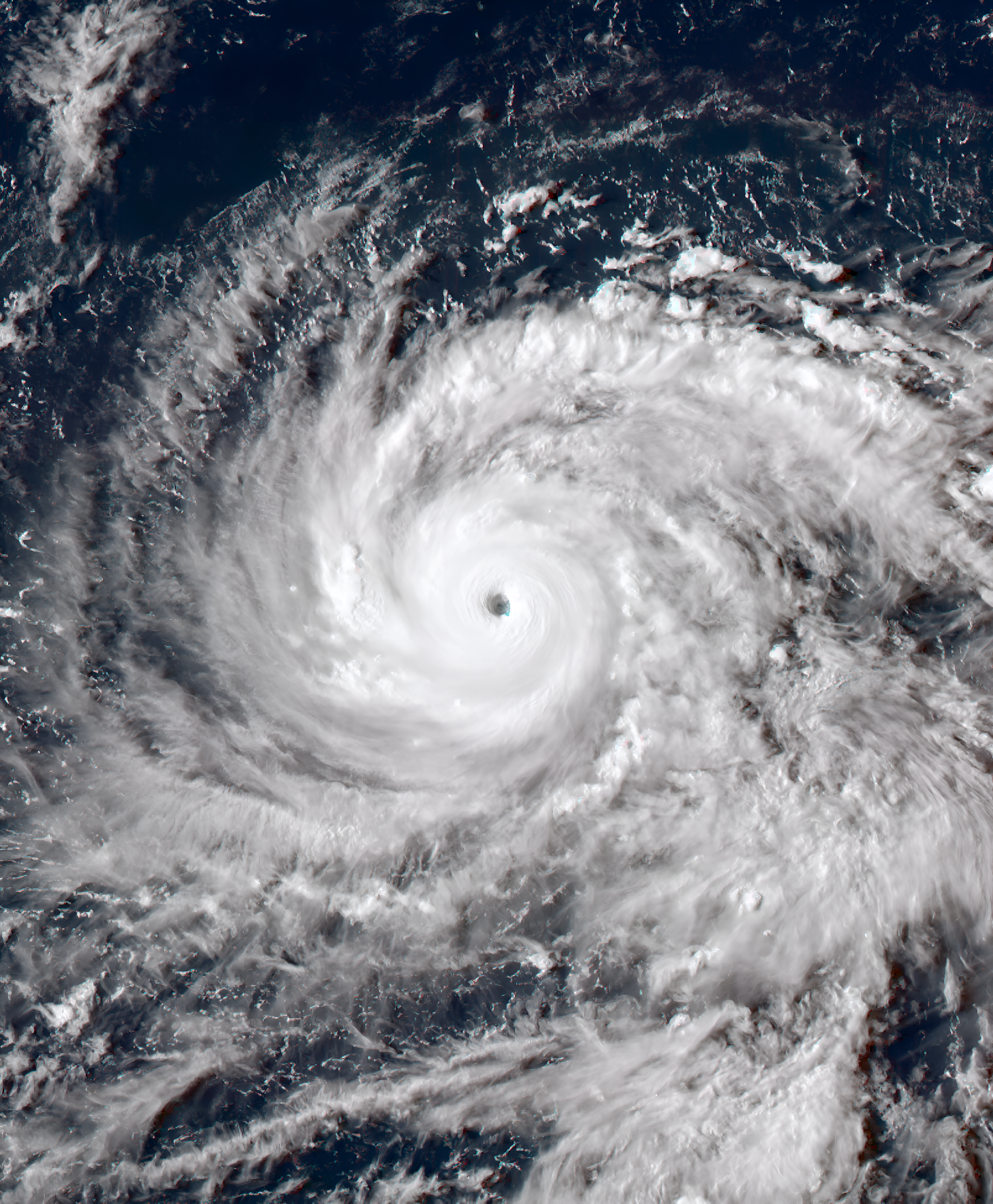
Typhoon Jebi

August was an active month with 21 systems having formed. Hurricane Florence made landfall in North Carolina with deadly flooding, resulting in $24.23 billion in damages and killed 53 people, making it one of the costliest hurricanes to strike North Carolina, and the fourth deadliest to strike. Florence was also the first storm in the turn of activity. In the same month, Hurricane Lane made an extremely close pass near Hawaii after peaking as a Category 5 Hurricane, becoming Hawaii's wettest tropical cyclone on record and the second wettest tropical cyclone in U.S. history, only behind Hurricane Harvey.

Tropical cyclones formed in August 2018
Storm name	Dates active	Max wind km/h (mph)	Pressure (hPa)	Areas affected	Damage (USD)	Deaths	Refs
Shanshan	August 2–10	130 (80)	970	Mariana Islands, Japan	$132 thousand	None	
Ileana	August 4–7	100 (65)^{4}	998	Western Mexico, Baja California Sur	Unknown	8	
John	August 5–10	175 (110)^{4}	964	Western Mexico, Baja California Sur, Southern California	None	None	
Yagi (Karding)	August 6–15	75 (45)	990	Philippines, Taiwan, Ryukyu Islands, China	$386 million	8	
Kristy	August 7–12	110 (70)^{4}	991	None	None	None	
BOB 04	August 7–8	45 (30)^{3}	992	East India	None	None	
Debby	August 7–9	85 (50)^{4}	998	None	None	None	
Bebinca	August 9–17	85 (50)	985	South China, Laos, Vietnam, Thailand, Myanmar	$367 million	19	
Leepi	August 10–15	95 (60)	994	Japan, South Korea	None	None	
Rumbia	August 14–19	85 (50)	985	Ryukyu Islands, China, Korean Peninsula, Russian Far East	$5.36 billion	53	
Soulik	August 15–24	155 (100)	950	Caroline Islands, Mariana Islands, Northeast China, Japan, Korean Peninsula, Russian Far East, Alaska	$84.5 million	86	
Lane	August 15–29	260 (160)^{4}	926	Hawaii	$250 million	1	
BOB 05	August 15–17	45 (30)^{3}	994	East India, Central India, West India	Unknown	None	
Ernesto	August 15–18	75 (45)^{4}	1003	Ireland, United Kingdom	None		
Cimaron	August 16–24	155 (100)	950	Marshall Islands, Mariana Islands, Japan, Aleutian Islands	$30.6 million	None	
24W (Luis)	August 22–26	55 (35)	994	Taiwan, East China	$34 million	7	
TD	August 24–26	Unspecified	1000	Ryukyu Islands, East China	None	None	
Miriam	August 26–September 2	155 (100)^{4}	974	None	None	None	
Jebi (Maymay)	August 26–September 4	195 (120)	915	Mariana Islands, Taiwan, Japan, Russian Far East, Arctic	$3.29 billion	17	
Norman	August 28–September 10	240 (150)^{4}	937	Hawaii	None	None	
Florence	August 31–September 17	240 (150)^{4}	937	West Africa, Cape Verde, Bermuda, Southeastern United States, Mid-Atlantic States, Atlantic Canada	>$24.23 billion	57	

=== September ===
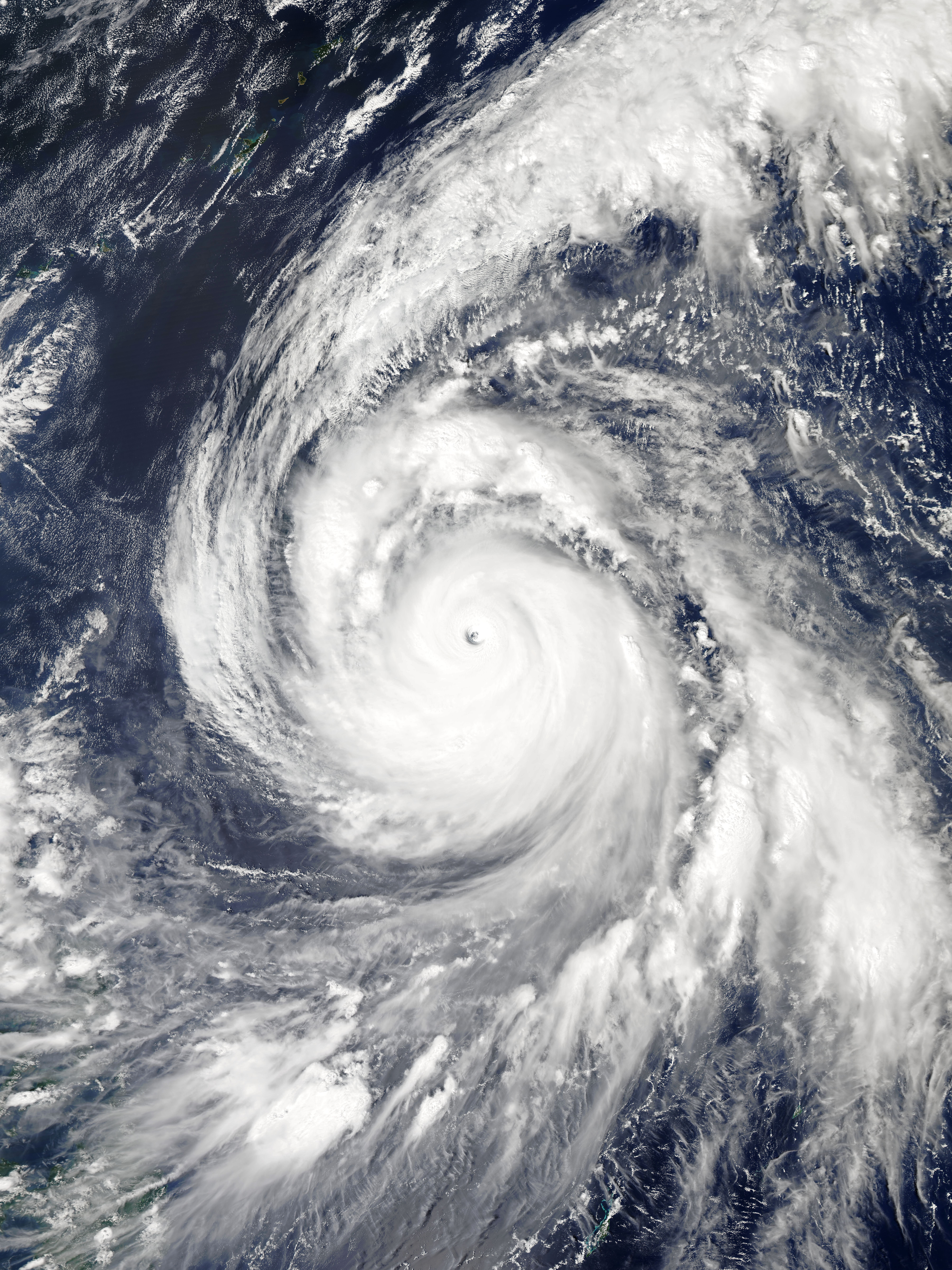
Typhoon Kong-rey

September was the most active month in the year at 23 tropical cyclones, including Hurricane Walaka, the third most intense in the Central Pacific on record and Typhoon Mangkhut as the third most intense worldwide of the year. Typhoon Kong-rey along with Hurricane Walaka both were Category 5 tropical cyclones on the Saffir–Simpson scale simultaneously in the Northern Hemisphere, marking the first time since 2005 that this rare occurrence happened. In the Atlantic, a turning point in the activity was also to be seen, with the 2018 Atlantic hurricane season to be the second Atlantic season in a row to see three hurricanes active at once on September 13.

Tropical cyclones formed in September 2018
Storm name	Dates active	Max wind km/h (mph)	Pressure (hPa)	Areas affected	Damage (USD)	Deaths	Refs
Olivia	September 1–13	215 (130)^{4}	951	Hawaii	$25 million	None	
Gordon	September 3–6	110 (70)^{4}	996	Greater Antilles, The Bahamas, Florida, Gulf Coast of the United States, Eastern United States, Ontario	$200 million	3	
TD	September 5–8	55 (35)	1000	Ryukyu Islands	None	None	
BOB 06	September 6–7	55 (35)^{3}	990	East India	Unknown	None	
Mangkhut (Ompong)	September 7–17	205 (125)	905	Marshall Islands, Mariana Islands, Philippines, Taiwan, Hong Kong, Macau, South China, Vietnam	$3.74 billion	134	
Helene	September 7–16	175 (110)^{4}	967	West Africa, Cape Verde, Azores, Ireland, United Kingdom, Norway	Unknown	3	
Isaac	September 7–15	120 (75)^{4}	995	West Africa, Lesser Antilles, Haiti, Jamaica, Cayman Islands, Cuba	Minimal	None	
Barijat (Neneng)	September 8–13	75 (45)	998	Philippines, Taiwan, South China, Vietnam	$7.3 million	None	
Paul	September 8–11	75 (45)^{4}	1002	None	None	None	
Joyce	September 12–19	85 (50)^{4}	995	None	None	None	
01	September 13–17	75 (45)	1004	None	None	None	
Nineteen-E	September 19–20	55 (35)^{4}	1002	Baja California Sur, Northwestern Mexico, Southwestern United States, Texas, Oklahoma, Arkansas	>$296 million	14	
Daye	September 19–22	65 (40)^{3}	992	Andhra Pradesh, East India, Central India, North India	Minimal	None	
Trami (Paeng)	September 20–October 1	195 (120)	915	Mariana Islands, Taiwan, Japan, Russian Far East, Alaska	$1 billion	4	
TD	September 21–22	Unspecified	1006	None	None	None	
Eleven	September 21–22	55 (35)^{4}	1007	None	None	None	
Kirk	September 22–29	100 (65)^{4}	998	Lesser Antilles	$444,000	2	
Leslie	September 23–October 13	150 (90)^{4}	968	Azores, Bermuda, East Coast of the United States, Madeira, Iberian Peninsula, France	>$500 million	17	
Rosa	September 25–October 2	240 (150)^{4}	936	Baja California Peninsula, Northwestern Mexico, Southwestern United States	$50.5 million	3	
29W	September 25–27	55 (35)	1008	None	None	None	
Liua	September 26–29	75 (45)	994	Solomon Islands, Papua New Guinea	None	None	
Zorbas	September 27–October 1	120 (75)	987	Tunisia, Libya, Greece, Italy, Turkey	Unknown	6	
Kong-rey (Queenie)	September 28–October 6	215 (130)	900	Caroline Islands, Mariana Islands, Japan, Taiwan, South Korea	$172 million	3	
Sergio	September 29–October 13	220 (140)^{4}	943	Baja CalifornNorthwestern Mexico, Southwestern United States	$352.1 million	2	
Walaka	September 29–October 6	260 (160)^{4}	921	Johnston Atoll, Northwestern Hawaiian Islands, Alaska, British Columbia	Minimal	None	

=== October ===
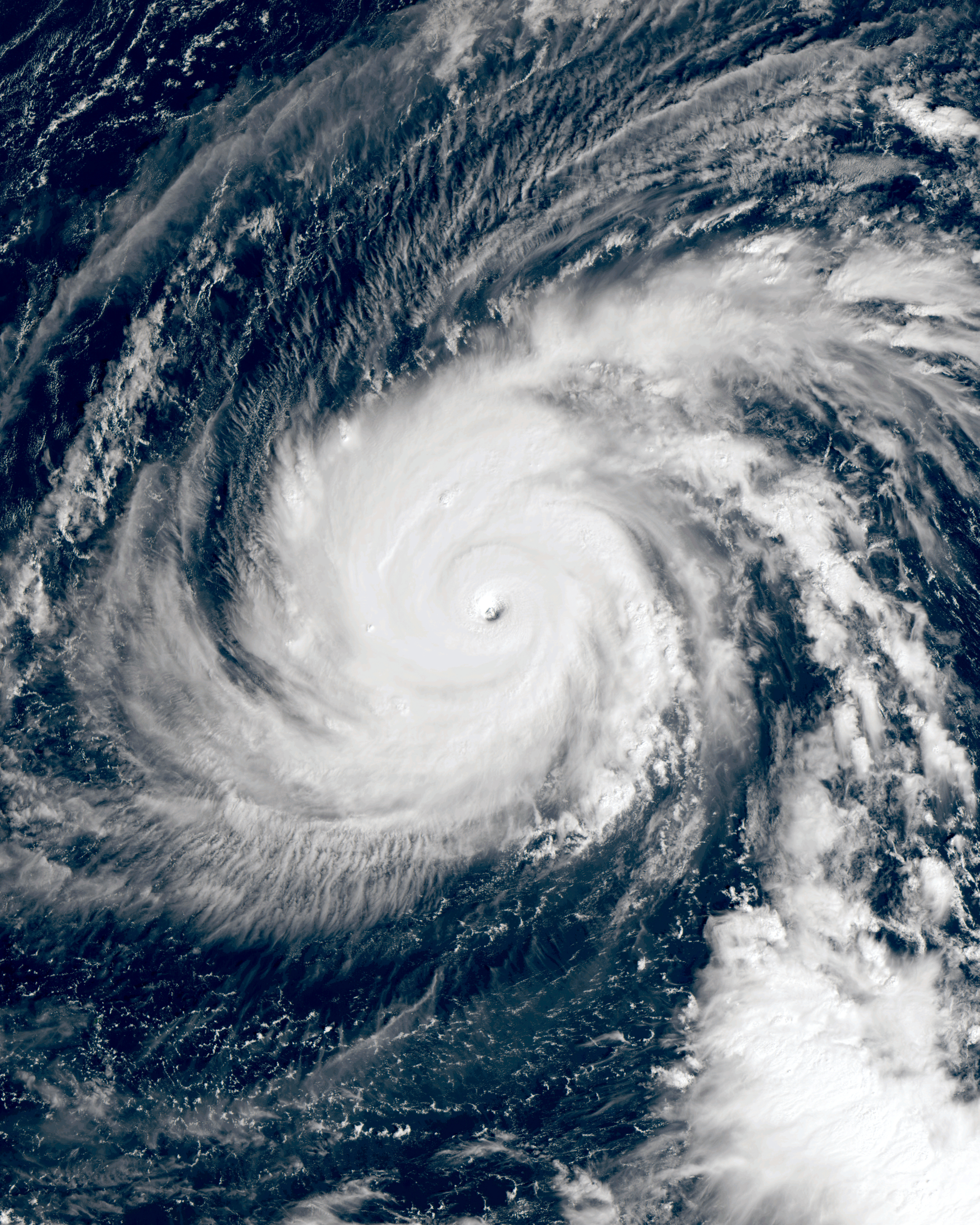
Typhoon Yutu

October was an active month of the year but less so than previous months at 11 tropical cyclones. Typhoon Yutu became the strongest tropical cyclone in 2018, neck-to-neck with Typhoon Kong-rey. Hurricane Michael caused $25.1 billion in damage after making landfall on the Florida Panhandle, becoming the third most intense hurricane to make landfall in the Continental United States in terms of minimum pressure. Cyclonic Storms Luban and Titli caused extensive damage throughout countries of Yemen and India, also becoming the first pair of tropical cyclones ever recorded to be active in both the Arabian Sea and Bay of Bengal simultaneously. Hurricane Willa also became the closest Category 5 to Mexico since Patricia.

Tropical cyclones formed in October 2018
Storm name	Dates active	Max wind km/h (mph)	Pressure (hPa)	Areas affected	Damage (USD)	Deaths	Refs
Luban	October 6–15	140 (85)^{3}	976	Yemen, Oman	$1 billion	14	
Michael	October 7–11	260 (160)^{4}	919	Central America, Yucatán Peninsula, Cayman Islands, Cuba, Southeastern United States, East Coast of the United States, Atlantic Canada, Iberian Peninsula	$25.1 billion	74	
Titli	October 8–12	150 (90)^{3}	970	Andhra Pradesh, East India	$920 million	85	
Nadine	October 9–13	100 (65)^{4}	995	None	None	None	
Tara	October 14–17	100 (65)^{4}	995	Southwestern Mexico	Unknown	None	
Vicente	October 19–23	85 (50)^{4}	1002	Honduras, El Salvador, Guatemala, Southwestern Mexico	$7.05 million	16	
TD	October 19–20	Unspecified	1008	Vietnam, Cambodia, Thailand, Myanmar	None	None	
Willa	October 20–24	260 (160)^{4}	925	Central America, Southwestern Mexico, Texas	$825 million	9	
TD	October 20	Unspecified	1008	None	None	None	
Yutu (Rosita)	October 21–November 2	215 (130)	900	Caroline Islands, Mariana Islands, Philippines, South China, Taiwan	$198 million	30	
Oscar	October 27–31	175 (110)^{4}	966	None	None	None	

=== November ===
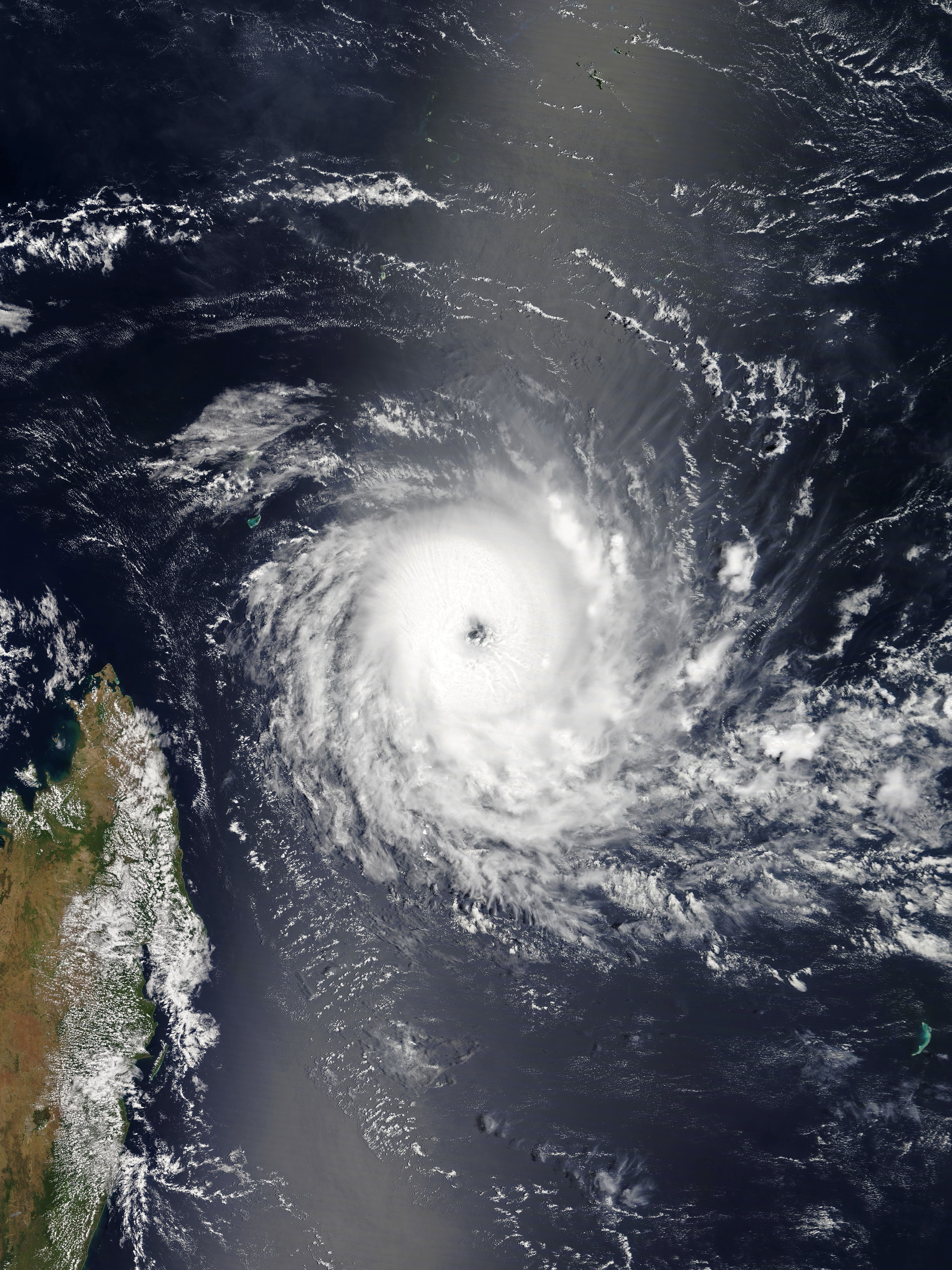
Cyclone Alcide, the strongest cyclone this month in terms of maximum sustained winds.

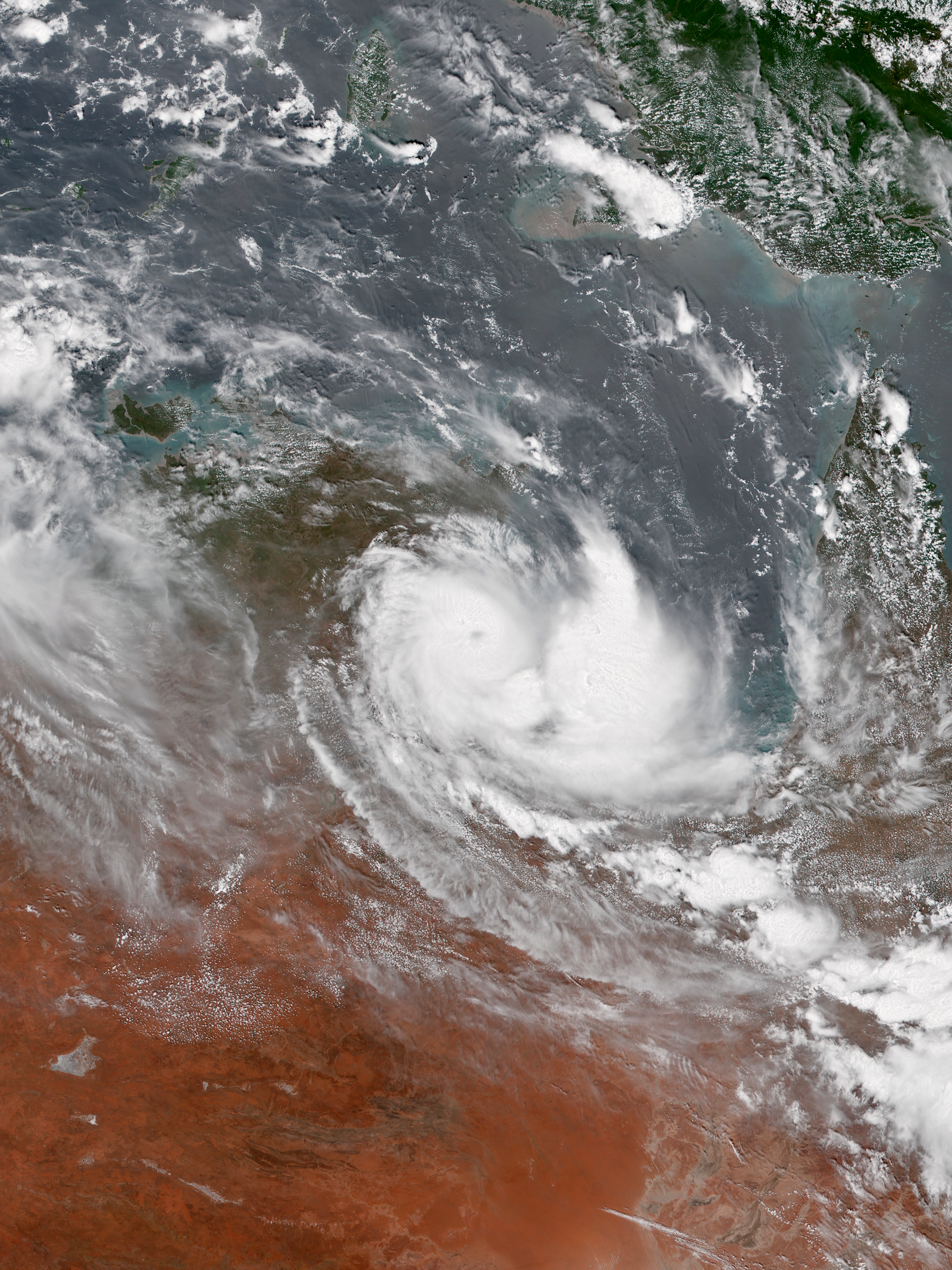
Cyclone Owen, the strongest cyclone this month in terms of minimum barometric pressure.

November featured 10 tropical cyclones. Cyclone Gaja made landfall in South India, resulting in about 60 fatalities.

Tropical cyclones formed in November 2018
Storm name	Dates active	Max wind km/h (mph)	Pressure (hPa)	Areas affected	Damage (USD)	Deaths	Refs
Xavier	November 2–5	100 (65)^{4}	995	Southwestern Mexico	None	None	
Alcide	November 5–11	185 (115)	960	Agaléga, Madagascar, Tanzania	None	None	
TD	November 9	<55 (35)	1002	None	None	None	
Bouchra	November 9–19	95 (60)	990	None	None	None	
Gaja	November 10–19	110 (70)^{3}	992	Andaman Islands, South India, Sri Lanka	$775 million	52	
02F	November 11–16	Unspecified	1003	Solomon Islands	None	None	
TL	November 14–18	Unspecified	1004	Java, Christmas Island	None	None	
Usagi (Samuel)	November 14–26	110 (70)	990	Caroline Islands, Philippines, Vietnam, Cambodia, Laos	$16 million	4	
Toraji	November 16–22	65 (40)	1004	Vietnam, Malay Peninsula	$43.2 million	22	
Man-yi (Tomas)	November 20–28	150 (90)	960	Caroline Islands, Alaska	None	None	
Owen	November 29–December 17	150 (90)	958	Solomon Islands, Papua New Guinea, Queensland, Northern Territory	$25 million	1	

=== December ===
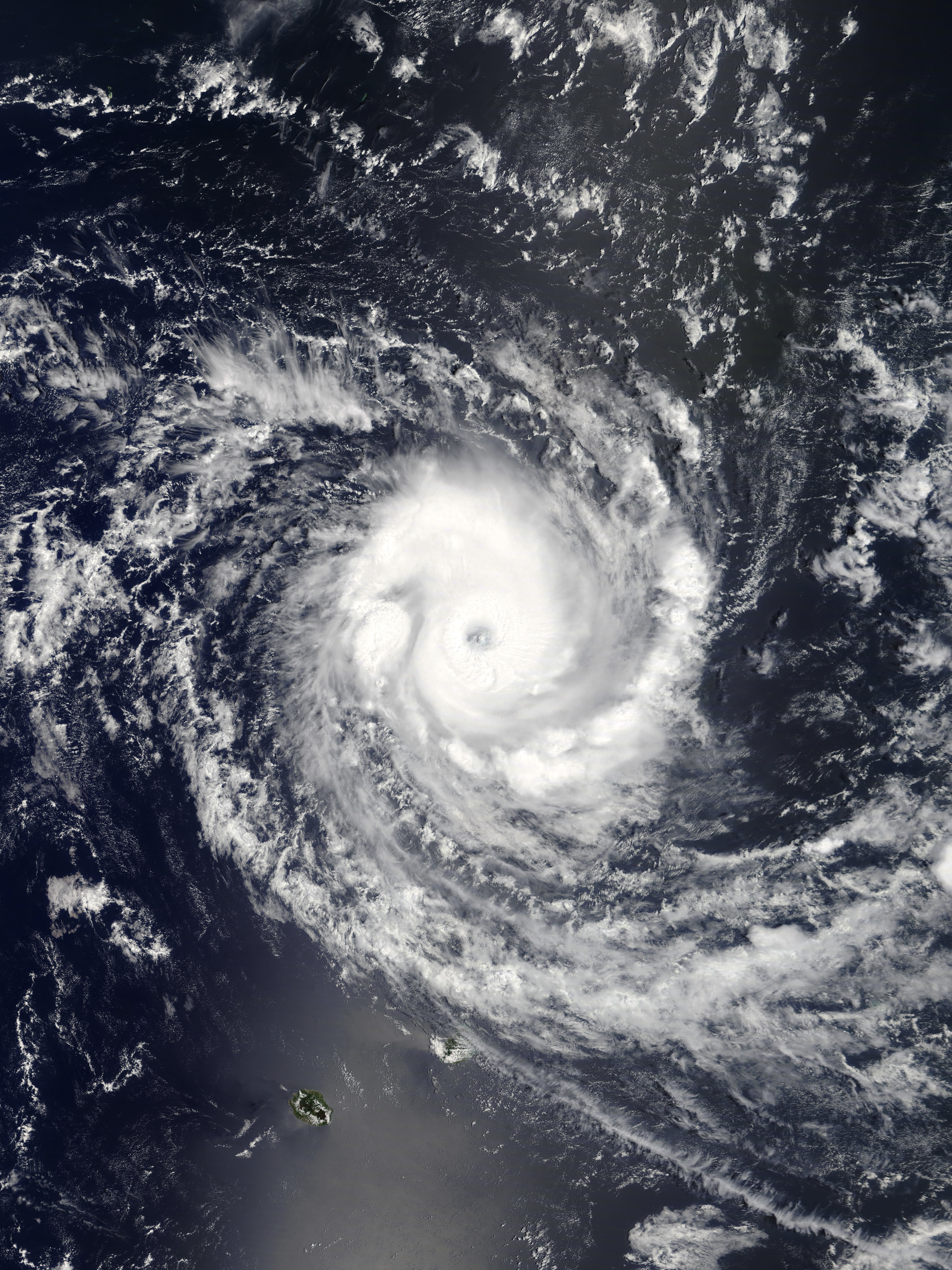
Cyclone Cilida

December was an active month with 13 tropical cyclones forming. Cyclone Cilida intensified into an Intense Tropical Cyclone, while never directly making landfall.

Tropical cyclones formed in December 2018
Storm name	Dates active	Max wind km/h (mph)	Pressure (hPa)	Areas affected	Damage (USD)	Deaths	Refs
TL	December 9–12	Unspecified	1005	Solomon Islands, Queensland	None	None	
Phethai	December 13–18	100 (65)^{3}	993	East India, Northeast India	$100 million	8	
Kenanga	December 14–22	185 (115)	942	None	None	None	
Cilida	December 16–24	215 (130)	940	Mauritius	Minimal	None	
35W (Usman)	December 25–29	55 (35)	1000	Palau, Philippines	$103 million	156	
TL	December 27–28	Unspecified	1001	Top End, Timor, Kimberley	None	None	
Penny	December 26–January 9	95 (60)	987	Papua New Guinea, Queensland	Minimal	None	
Mona	December 28–January 7	95 (60)	985	Solomon Islands, Fiji	Minimal	None	
03F	December 28–January 1	55 (35)	998	Solomon Islands, Fiji	None	None	
TL	December 29–30	Unspecified	1007	Tagula Island	None	None	
TL	December 30–January 2	Unspecified	1007	Java	None	None	
05F	December 31–January 2	Unspecified	998	None	None	None	

== Global effects ==
There are a total of seven tropical cyclone basins that tropical cyclones typically form in this table, data from all these basins are added.

Season name		Areas affected	Systems formed	Named storms	Hurricane-force tropical cyclones	Damage (2018 USD)	Deaths	Ref.
North Atlantic Ocean (Note: The wind speeds for this tropical cyclone/basin are based on the Saffir Simpson Scale which uses 1-minute sustained winds.)		Yucatán Peninsula, Greater Antilles, Gulf Coast of the United States, Southeastern United States, Midwestern United States, Lesser Antilles, Lucayan Archipelago, Bermuda, East Coast of the United States, Western Europe, West Africa, Cape Verde, Mid-Atlantic States, Atlantic Canada, Azores, Madeira, Iberian Peninsula, Faroe Islands	16	15	8	$50.54 billion	84 (88)	
Eastern and Central Pacific Ocean		Central America, Mexico, Baja California Peninsula, Hawaii, Johnston Atoll, Northwestern Hawaiian Islands, Southwestern United States, Alaskan Panhandle, British Columbia	26	23	13	$1.64 billion	50 (7)	
Western Pacific Ocean (Note: Only systems that formed either before or on December 31, 2018 are counted in the seasonal totals.)		Caroline Islands, Marshall Islands, Mariana Islands, Guam, Philippines, Taiwan, China, Hong Kong, Macau, Myanmar, Vietnam, Cambodia, Laos, Thailand, Malay Peninsula, Ryukyu Islands, Honshu, Japan, Korean Peninsula, Russian Far East, Alaska, Aleutian Islands, Palau	43	28	16	$30.6 billion	793	
North Indian Ocean (Note: The wind speeds for this tropical cyclone/basin are based on the IMD Scale which uses 3-minute sustained winds.)		Andaman Islands, Myanmar, India, Bangladesh, Maldives, Arabian Peninsula, Horn of Africa,	14	7	5	$4.33 billion	283	
South-West Indian Ocean	January – June (Note: Only systems that formed either on or after January 1, 2018 are counted in the seasonal totals.) (Note: The wind speeds for this tropical cyclone are based on Météo-France, which uses wind gusts.)	Madagascar, Réunion, Mauritius	7	6	6	$326.64 million	78	
South-West Indian Ocean	July – December	Agaléga, Madagascar, Tanzania, Mauritius	3	3	2	—N/a	—N/a	
Australian region	January – June	Indonesia, Christmas Island, Australia, Cocos (Keeling) Islands, Solomon Islands, New Caledonia, Tanimbar Islands, East Timor, Papua New Guinea, Aru Islands	9	8	5	$165 million	—N/a	
Australian region	July – December	Papua New Guinea, Solomon Islands, Australia	5	5	2	$25 million	1	
South Pacific Ocean	January – June	New Caledonia, New Zealand, Fiji, Wallis and Futuna, Samoan Islands, Niue, Tonga, Vanuatu, Solomon Islands, Rotuma	8	5	3	$401 million	12	
South Pacific Ocean	July – December	Solomon Islands, Fiji	2	—N/a	—N/a	—N/a	—N/a	
Mediterranean tropical-like cyclone		Western Europe	1	1	1	$1 million	6	
Worldwide			134 (Note: The sum of the number of systems in each basin will not equal the number shown as the total. This is because when systems move between basins, it creates a discrepancy in the actual number of systems.)	101	61	$88 billion	1,307 (95)	

== Notes ==
^{1} Only systems that formed either on or after January 1, 2018 are counted in the seasonal totals.
^{2} Only systems that formed either before or on December 31, 2018 are counted in the seasonal totals.
^{3} The wind speeds for this tropical cyclone/basin are based on the IMD Scale which uses 3-minute sustained winds.–
^{4} The wind speeds for this tropical cyclone/basin are based on the Saffir–Simpson scale which uses 1-minute sustained winds.
^{5} The wind speeds for this tropical cyclone are based on Météo-France which uses gust winds.
^{6} 04F formed as a tropical low in the Australian region on December 28 before crossing into the South Pacific basin on December 31. This system was later named Mona in January 2019 and thus only counts for that year.
^{7} 36W was the last tropical depression to form in the 2018 Pacific typhoon season. It was later named Pabuk on January 1, 2019, and as such only counts for that year.

== See also ==
- Tropical cyclones by year
- List of earthquakes in 2018
- Tornadoes of 2018
- 2018 wildfire season
- 2018 Kerala floods
- 2018 Japan floods
