= Wildfires in 2018 =

Wildfire season in 2018

2018 wildfire season
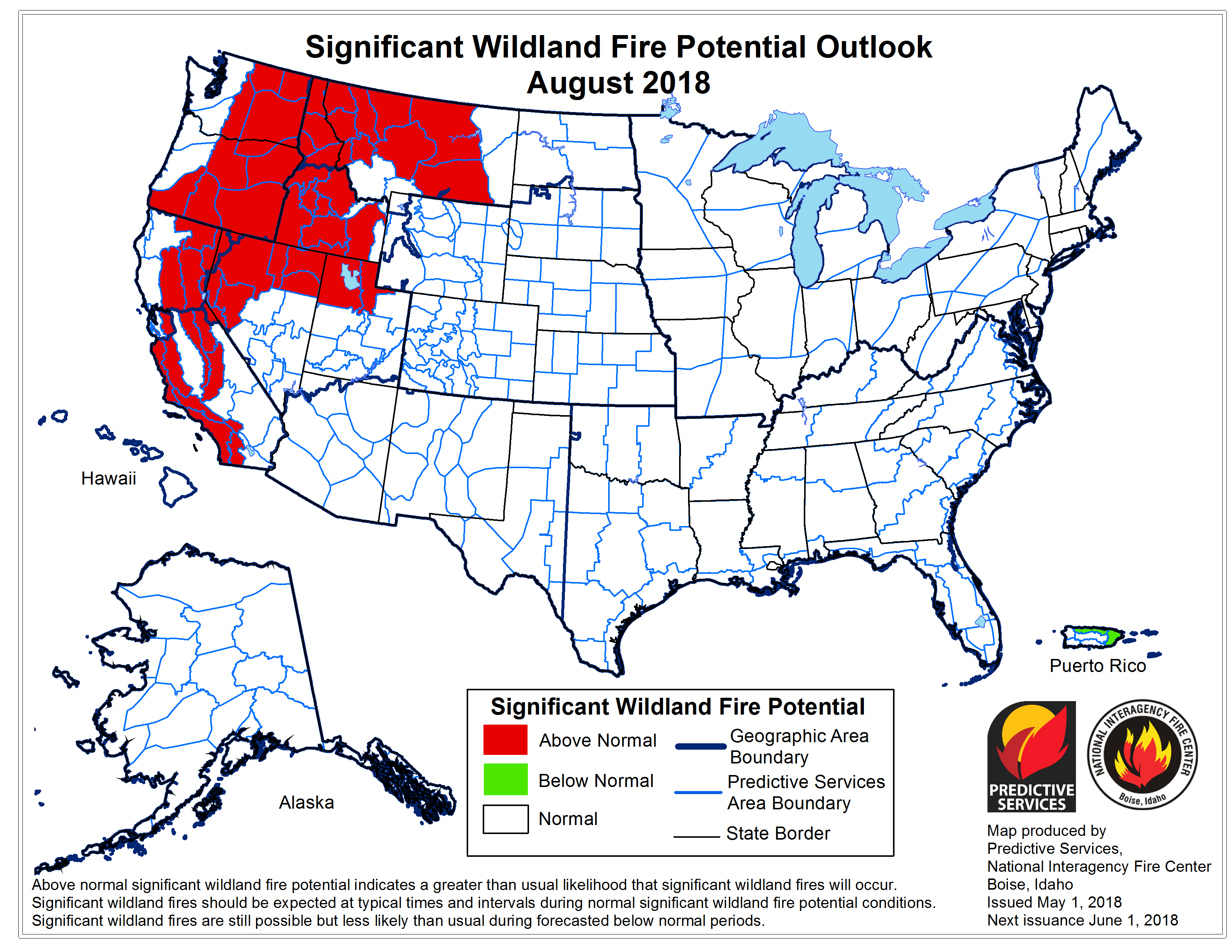
- Wildfire prediction for the United States
- Date: January–December 2018

The 2018 wildfire season involved wildfires on multiple continents. An extremely rare event occurred when wildfires broke out north of the Arctic Circle in Scandinavia, with one burning on the Russia–Finland border near the Barents Sea on July 20. By the end of the calendar year, the fires in British Columbia had burned more area than in any prior recorded year; and California experienced the single largest (by area) fire on record, and a fire destroyed more structures than in any other in modern history. Similarly, the UK saw the most wildfires ever recorded in a single year, at 76, while Greece saw the deadliest wildfires in its history, with 102 casualties.

Below is a partial list of articles on wildfires from around the world in the year 2018.

== Asia ==
- 2018 Russian wildfires

== Europe ==
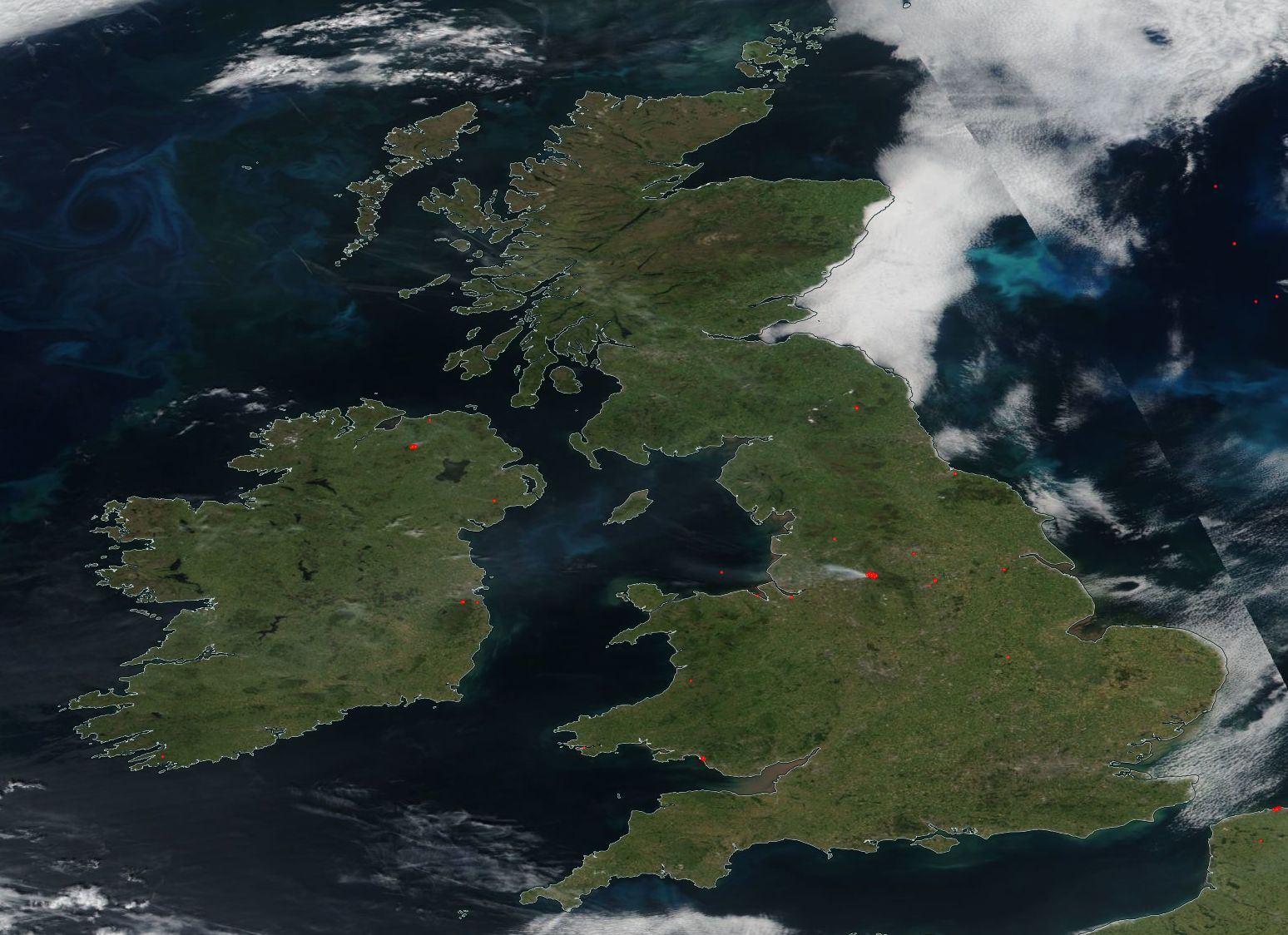
Wildfires in the UK and Ireland, June 2018

- 2018 Attica wildfires, Greece
- 2018 Sweden wildfires
- 2018 United Kingdom wildfires

== North America ==
GOES satellite captured wildfires on the west coast of North America

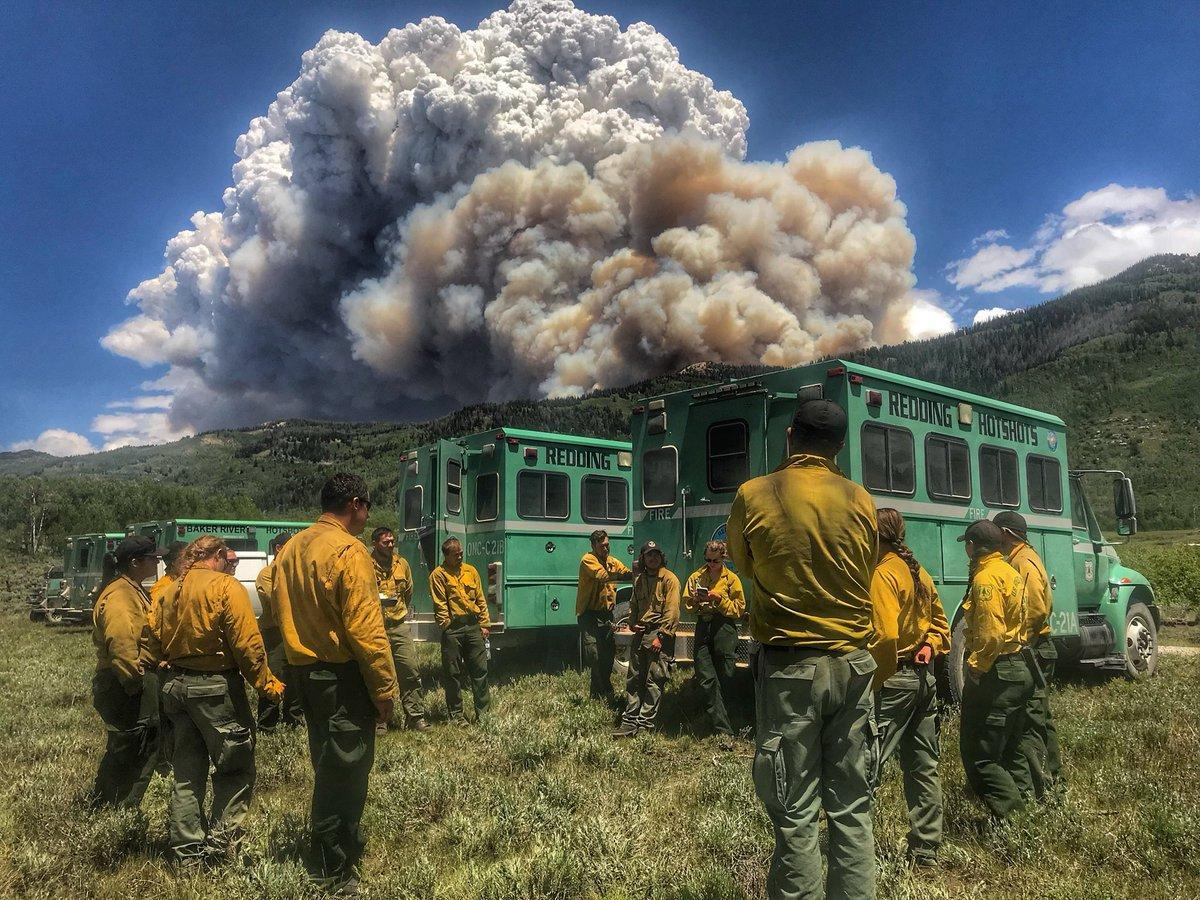
Trail Mountain Fire in Utah

A U.S. national state of emergency was declared on July 28 due to the California fires, which had killed at least six people. In August, the Mendocino Complex Fire became the second largest fire in California history and the Mendocino Complex Fire became the state's largest.

Fires in British Columbia were the second worst in the history of the province, with over 945 square kilometres (234,000 acres) burned.

- 2018 British Columbia wildfires, Canada
- 2018 California wildfires
- 2018 Montana wildfires
- 2018 Nevada wildfires
- 2018 Oregon wildfires
- 2018 Utah wildfires
- 2018 Washington wildfires

== Oceania ==
- 2017–18 Australian bushfire season
