= 2018 Montana wildfires =

Wildfire season in Montana, United States

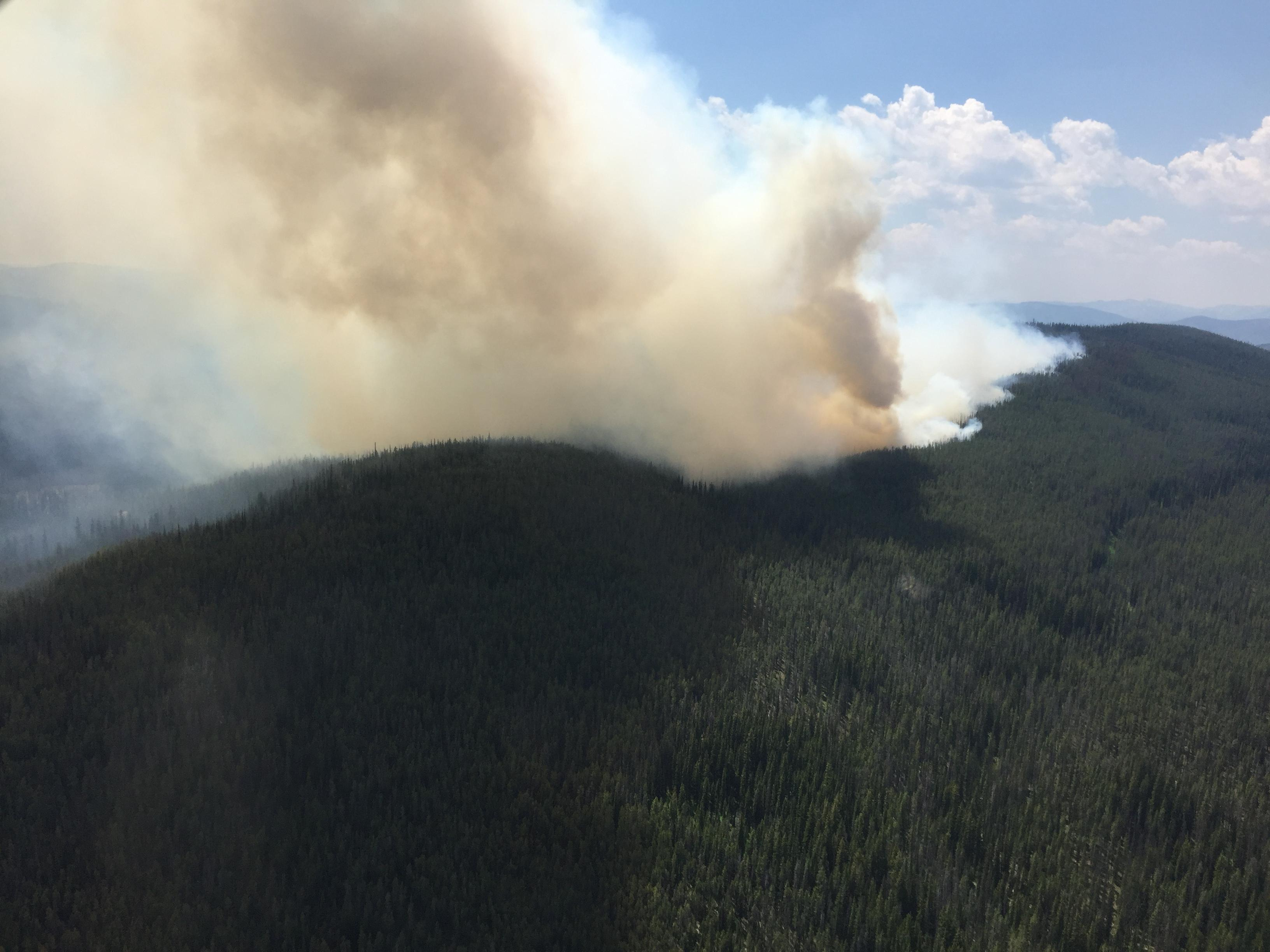
- Reynolds Lake Fire, July 19
- Date: June, 2018 – September, 2018

The 2018 wildfire season in Montana began around June, 2018 and ended around September, 2018.

The Highway 37 Fire is a fire above Montana Highway 37 west of Libby, Montana at 48.422°N 115.474°W, near a Superfund site which is a former vermiculite mine. It was spotted on July 19. Firefighters needed to wear respirators to protect themselves from exposure to asbestos mixed with duff and bark by mining operations and mobilized by the fire.

The Reynolds Lake Fire, caused by lightning on July 17, straddles the Bitterroot National Forest and Salmon-Challis National Forest southwest of Darby, Montana at 45.564°N 114.513°W. It reached over 1,000 acres (400 ha) in extent by July 22.
