= Brown ocean effect =

Weather phenomenon

Cyclone Kelvin in 2018 maintaining a clear eye over Western Australia

Before Tropical Storm Bill made landfall over Texas, eastern Texas experienced several days of rain that began flooding areas to the south east and northern parts of the state. As Tropical Storm Bill moved northward through Texas, it is hypothesized that it fed off the highly saturated ground (as if it were still over the ocean) and can be seen slightly intensifying (via winds) as it moved into Oklahoma and progressed to the northeast.

The brown ocean effect is an observed weather phenomenon involving some tropical cyclones after landfall. Normally, hurricanes and tropical storms lose strength when they make landfall, but when the brown ocean effect is in play, tropical cyclones maintain strength or even intensify over land surfaces. Australia is the most conducive environment for this effect, where such storm systems are called agukabams.

== Background ==
One source of the brown ocean effect has been identified as the large amount of latent heat that can be released from extremely wet soils. A 2013 NASA study found that, from 1979 to 2008, 45 of 227 tropical storms either gained or maintained strength after making landfall. The press release stated, "The land essentially mimics the moisture-rich environment of the ocean, where the storm originated." Originally, research devoted to extratropical cyclones, storms that first derive energy from the warm ocean waters and later from the conjecture of various air masses, explained the intensification of storms after landfall. However, as research into these storms persists, Andersen and Shepherd, the two leading scientists behind the NASA study, discovered that some of these storms were not transitioning from warm-core to cold-core but were actually maintaining their warm-core dynamics, while ultimately outputting a greater measure of rainfall.

In order for the brown ocean effect to take place, three land conditions must be met: "First, the lower level of the atmosphere mimics a tropical atmosphere with minimal variation in temperature. Second, soils in the vicinity of the storms need to contain ample moisture. Finally, evaporation of the soil moisture releases latent heat, which the team found must measure at least 70 watts averaged per square meter." Storm systems impacted by the brown ocean effect gave rise to a new sub-category of tropical storm type called Tropical Cyclone Maintenance and Intensification Event or TCMI. Another study concluded that latent surface heat flux from land surfaces actually have the potential to be larger than from the ocean, albeit for brief periods only. Andersen and Shepherd are also examining the effects of climate change on TCMIs, looking into the potential intensification of these storms due to increase or decrease in the degree of wetness and dryness in areas susceptible to these systems.

== Examples ==
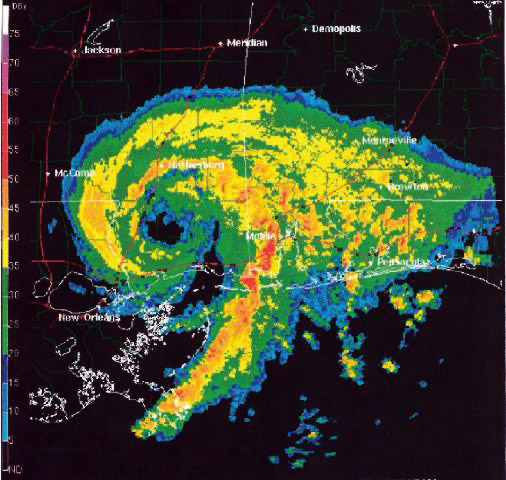
Tropical Storm Allison with an eye-like feature over Mississippi

In the North Indian Ocean and Australian region, countless cases of brown ocean-type tropical depressions forming over the Indian subcontinent and Australia have been reported. The IMD and BoM have been known to issue advisories for these systems, while the JTWC usually does not, due to the common lack of intensity and structure to these systems. A recent example of a brown ocean-type system has been characterized in Cyclone Tauktae, as it maintained its intensity despite making landfall.

In 1972, Hurricane Agnes formed as a tropical depression over the Yucatán Peninsula. It made landfall in Florida as a Category 1 hurricane, and quickly collapsed into a tropical depression. However, it reintensified into a tropical storm over central North Carolina.

In 1973, an African easterly wave completed tropical cyclogenesis into a tropical depression while still inland over Guinea, some hours before the system's center crossed over from the African mainland to the Atlantic Ocean, where it later developed into Tropical Storm Christine.

In 1978, a tropical depression formed a few miles away from the coast of Texas and developed into Tropical Storm Amelia over Texas and caused flooding. Amelia slightly strengthened over land before weakening and fizzling out, however it maintained strength and even came as close as developing an eye like feature, as well as having bursts of convection.

2005's Tropical Storm Arlene made landfall near Pensacola, Florida, where it remained a tropical depression and it held its intensity and structure for two more days as it traversed inland, where it finally dissipated near Flint, Michigan.

2005’s Hurricane Katrina made its first landfall in Florida on August 25 on the southern end of the peninsula. It held its intensity and only weakened slightly.

Tropical Storm Erin in 2007 intensified over central Texas, eventually forming an eye over Oklahoma. Tropical Storm Erin gained even more traction as it travelled across the plains, a rare feat as most tropical storms weaken as they go farther inland. Andersen states "Until events like Erin in 2007, there was not much focus on post-landfall tropical cyclones unless they transitioned. Erin really brought attention to the inland intensification of tropical cyclones."

Tropical Storm Fay strengthened to near hurricane strength upon landfall over the Florida mainland and briefly forming an eye-like feature before weakening. The cause of this was the waterlogged terrain of South Florida, specifically Lake Okeechobee and the Everglades.

Saturated soil conditions from the 2015 Texas–Oklahoma flood and tornado outbreak sustained Tropical Storm Bill for a longer period of time.

In 2016, Tropical Depression Eleven made landfall in Eastern Florida. While over land, it became the first tropical cyclone to reach tropical storm strength while over Florida, where it was named Julia.

Tropical Cyclone Kelvin in 2018 made landfall over Western Australia and developed a clear eye while continuing to strengthen, despite moving over the Great Sandy Desert, where most tropical cyclones rapidly weaken. The strengthening was assisted by the affected areas already experiencing record or near-record rainfall due to the preceding Cyclones Hilda, Joyce, and Low 11U passing over the same area in the months leading up to Kelvin.

Tropical Storm Alberto in 2018 maintained its status as a tropical depression for over two days after landfall, before becoming post-tropical over Michigan.

Tropical Storm Claudette formed just prior to landfall on southern Louisiana on June 19, 2021, possibly from the moist soils from recent flooding. The system weakened to a tropical depression before it restrengthened back to a tropical storm inland over North Carolina on June 21, 2021.

Hurricane Ida in 2021, which struck Louisiana, continued to maintain Category 4 winds some four hours after landfall.

Cyclone Ellie of 2022–2023 maintained tropical depression status days after landfall and even restrengthened into a tropical storm for a short amount of time over Western Australia.

Hurricane Helene in 2024 was able to move quickly through Florida, Georgia, and the Carolinas due to the brown ocean effect.

Cyclone Luana in 2026 was able to maintain tropical cyclone status well inland over Western Australia due to the brown ocean effect.

== See also ==
- Cyclolysis
- Unusual areas of tropical cyclone formation
