= 2018 Broome flood =

2018 flood in Kimberley, Western Australia

- Date: January and February 2018
- Location: In and around Broome in the Kimberley region of Western Australia
- Property damage: Around 100 kilometres (62 mi) of the road between Broome and Derby

The 2018 Broome flood was a severe flood that occurred in January and February 2018 in and around Broome in the Kimberley region of Western Australia.

The flooding was triggered following record breaking rainfall. Broome received 1,502 millimetres (59 in) of rainfall in the first two months of 2018, the equivalent of two years worth.

The rainfall was caused by Cyclone Joyce, which struck Broome on 12 January 2018. Another tropical low struck the area two weeks later, which delivered further rains. Cyclone Kelvin then hit on 16 February.

Dampier Creek and other waterways burst their banks and inundated low-lying areas. The town became isolated when the Great Northern Highway was cut to the south and east of the town. Some residents of surrounding areas had to be evacuated and supplies had to be air dropped to isolated communities.

An area of the Kimberley about the size of Victoria was isolated once the highway was cut. The floodwater also caused damage to around 100 kilometres (62 mi) of the road between Broome and Derby with another 12 km (7 mi) remaining underwater south of Broome near Roebuck Plains a week after the floods.

== See also ==
- 2017–18 Australian region cyclone season
