= Cyclone Kelvin =

Category 3 Australia cyclone in 2018

Severe Tropical Cyclone Kelvin
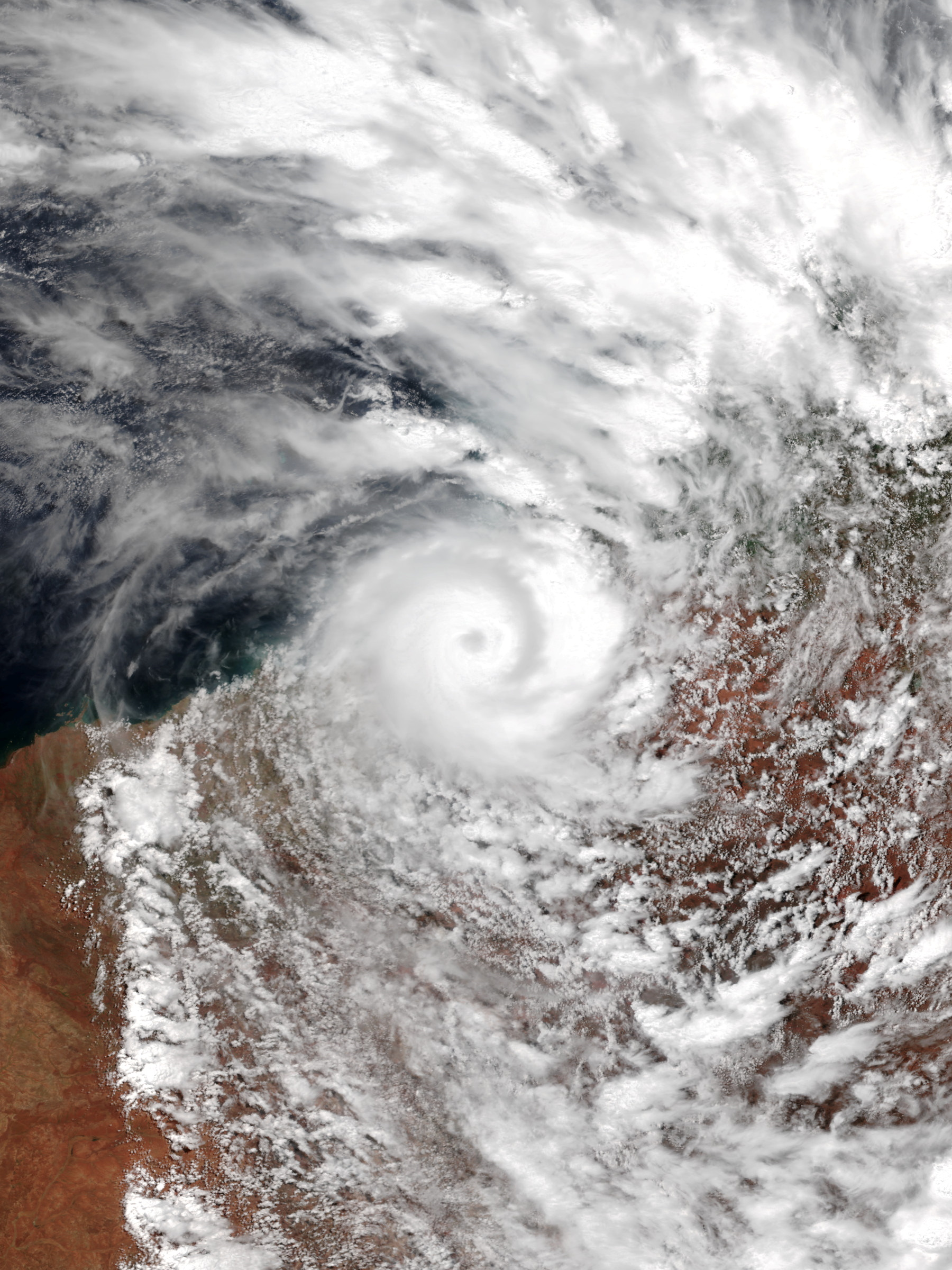
- Kelvin during its peak intensity over Western Australia on 18 February

Meteorological history
- Formed: 11 February 2018
- Remnant low: 19 February 2018
- Dissipated: 21 February 2018

Category 3 severe tropical cyclone
- 10-minute sustained (Aus)
- Highest winds: 150 km/h (90 mph)
- Lowest pressure: 955 hPa (mbar); 28.20 inHg

Category 1-equivalent tropical cyclone
- 1-minute sustained (SSHWS/JTWC)
- Highest winds: 140 km/h (85 mph)
- Lowest pressure: 971 hPa (mbar); 28.67 inHg

Overall effects
- Fatalities: None
- Damage: $25 million (2018 USD)
- Areas affected: Northern Territory, Western Australia, South Australia
- IBTrACS
- Part of the 2017–18 Australian region cyclone season

Severe Tropical Cyclone Kelvin was a strong tropical cyclone that impacted Western Australia in February 2018, causing moderate damage. The system was first identified as a weak tropical low on the morning of 11 February over the Northern Territory's Tiwi Islands by the Bureau of Meteorology (BoM). The low moved southwestwards over land and emerged over the Indian Ocean near Broome on 16 February. The storm intensified into a Category 1 tropical cyclone on the following day, becoming the sixth named storm of the 2017–18 Australian region cyclone season. Kelvin subsequently moved slowly eastwards and began to rapidly intensify in the hours prior to landfall. On 18 February, the storm crossed the coast along Eighty Mile Beach as a Category 3 severe tropical cyclone on the Australian scale, and a high-end Category 1 hurricane-equivalent cyclone on the Saffir–Simpson scale. Despite being over land, Kelvin weakened at a slow rate over the next few days, and was downgraded to a tropical low on 19 February. The remnant low of the system drifted over the Outback before being last noted by BoM on 21 February.

Kelvin brought widespread heavy rainfall to the Kimberley region which had already been saturated by other tropical cyclones earlier in the season. As a result, significant flooding occurred in parts of the Kimberley, including in the towns of Broome, which recorded a record annual rainfall total following the storm, and Kalumburu. Property damage was sustained at Broome and Nita Downs, where the cyclone made landfall. Additionally, the Great Northern Highway sustained infrastructural damage as a result of the heavy rainfall and flooding, cutting off access to the towns and leading to a shortage of supplies. Repairs were estimated to take months. Pastoral stations were heavily affected by the cyclone, including Anna Plains Station, which sustained property damage, and Mandora Station, half of which was completely flooded. Overall, Cyclone Kelvin incurred an estimated AUS$25 million ($25 million in 2018 USD) in losses.

== Meteorological history ==
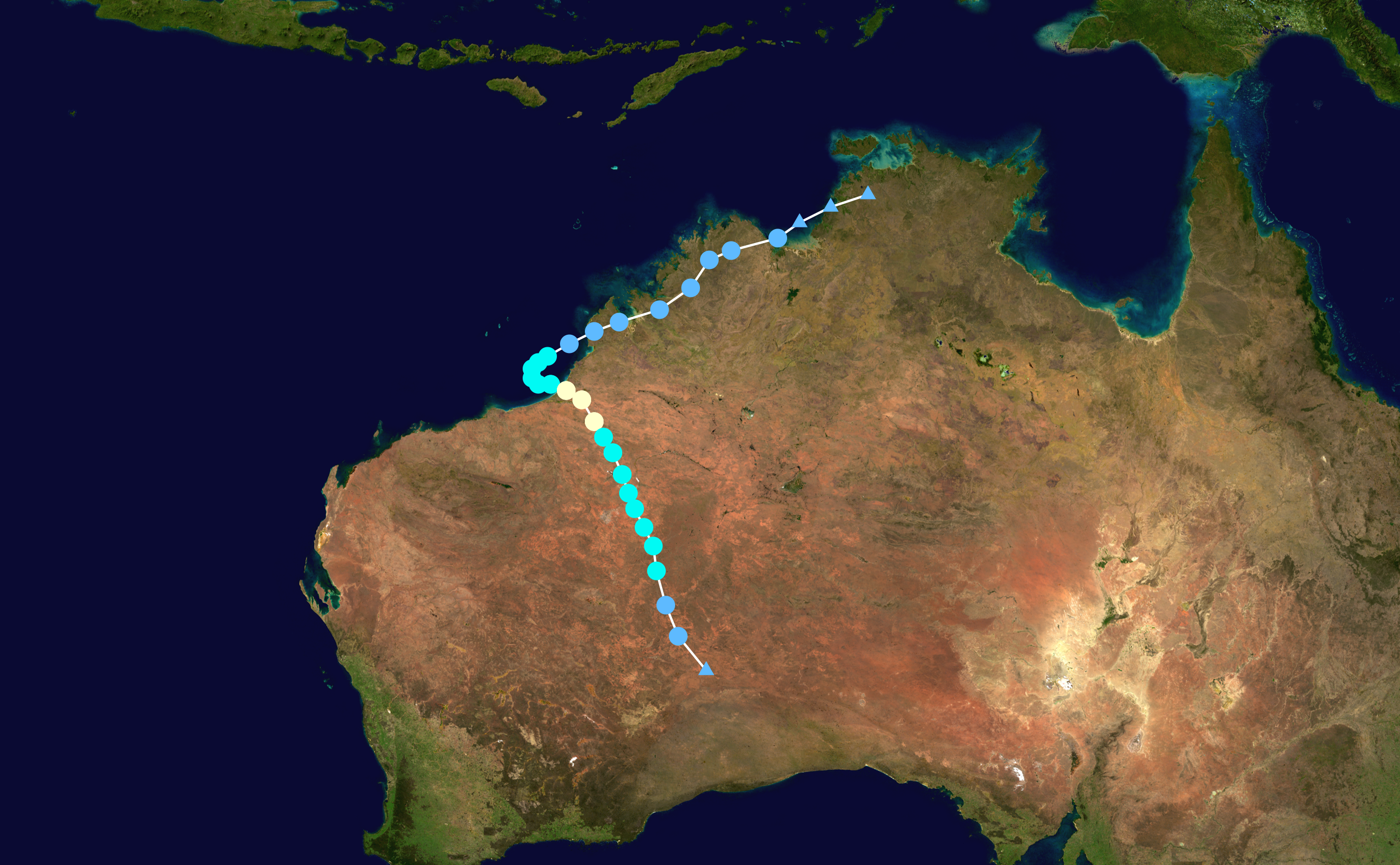
Map plotting the storm's track and intensity, according to the Saffir–Simpson scale Map key Saffir–Simpson scale Tropical depression (≤38 mph, ≤62 km/h) Tropical storm (39–73 mph, 63–118 km/h) Category 1 (74–95 mph, 119–153 km/h) Category 2 (96–110 mph, 154–177 km/h) Category 3 (111–129 mph, 178–208 km/h) Category 4 (130–156 mph, 209–251 km/h) Category 5 (≥157 mph, ≥252 km/h) Unknown Storm type Tropical cyclone Subtropical cyclone Extratropical cyclone, remnant low, tropical disturbance, or monsoon depression

During the morning of 11 February, the Bureau of Meteorology identified a developing tropical low pressure system near the Tiwi Islands, off the northwest coast of the Northern Territory. During the following days, the low, designated 17U, tracked over land on a general west-southwesterly course, gradually intensifying. As the system approached the coast, the BoM began issuing warnings on it, and forecast the low to potentially strengthen to a category 3 severe tropical cyclone over the following days. The Joint Typhoon Warning Center (JTWC) also issued a tropical cyclone formation alert on the low around this time. The system emerged over the Indian Ocean at about 8:00 am AWST on 16 February; however, contrary to previous forecasts, it was generally slow to develop.

IR image of Tropical Low 17U, which became Cyclone Kelvin hours later.

About twelve hours later, the JTWC assessed the storm as having attained one-minute sustained winds of 65 km/h (40 mph); hence, the agency upgraded it to Tropical Storm 10S at 8:00 pm AWST. The cyclone continued to slowly strengthen, and was upgraded to a category 1 tropical cyclone by the BoM at 2:00 pm AWST on the following day, whereupon it was named Kelvin. Tropical Cyclone Kelvin's movement speed slowed considerably at this stage, and it proceeded to turn sharply to the east. Aided by favorable environmental conditions, the system began to rapidly strengthen as it approached the north coast of Western Australia. This intensification, fueled by a strong Rossby wave, continued until landfall.

Kelvin ultimately made landfall near Anna Plains Station along Eighty Mile Beach at 8:00 am AWST on 18 February as a category 3 severe tropical cyclone on the Australian scale, with 10-minute sustained winds of 150 km/h (90 mph), and a minimum central barometric pressure of 955 hPa (28.20 inHg). The JTWC assessed the system as a high-end category 1 hurricane-equivalent cyclone on the Saffir–Simpson scale, with one-minute sustained winds of 150 km/h (90 mph). After making landfall, Tropical Cyclone Kelvin turned to the south-southeast, and tracked inland over the Kimberley region of Western Australia. Despite losing the ocean as its primary source of energy, the cyclone was slow to weaken; this was partially due to the flat nature of the terrain and possibly a result of the brown ocean effect as well.

The system was downgraded to tropical low intensity by the BoM at 2:00 pm AWST on 19 February, after approximately 30 hours over the flat desert terrain of Western Australia. Gale-force winds did persist in the southeastern quadrant, however. The remnant low was last noted by the BoM at 2:00 pm AWST on 21 February as it was drifting over the Outback. Unlike the BoM, the JTWC maintained the system's classification as a tropical storm for another 36 hours after this, only declaring Kelvin dissipated at 2:00 am AWST on 21 February. The remnant moisture of the system continued to track south-southeastwards across the Nullarbor Plain on 22 February, and then emerged over the Great Australian Bight shortly afterward.

== Impacts ==
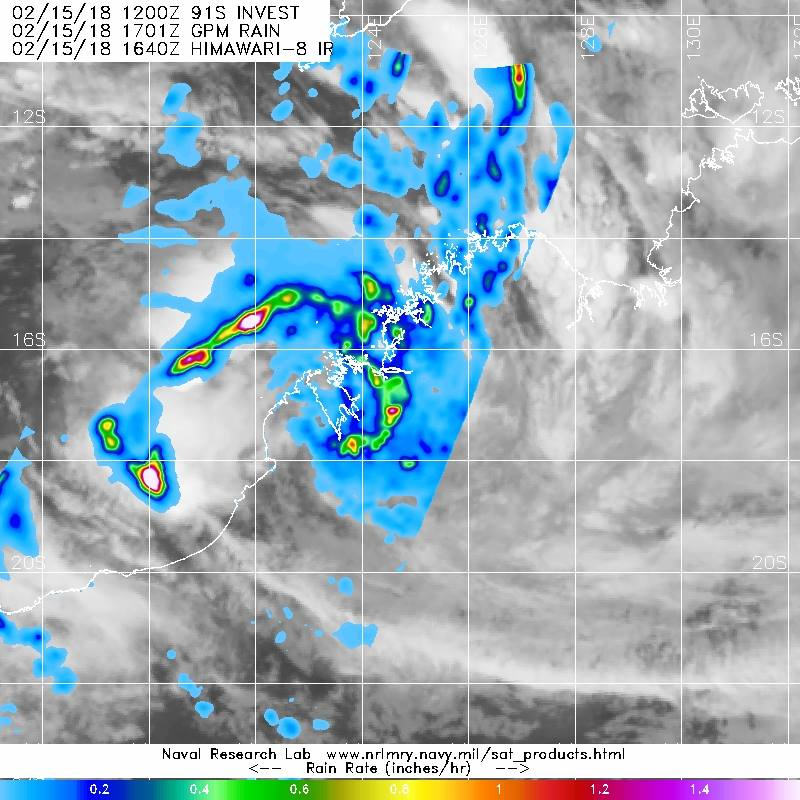
Satellite measurements of rainfall from Tropical Low 17U, which later became Cyclone Kelvin.

Severe Tropical Cyclone Kelvin and its precursor low brought widespread heavy rainfall to the regions of Western Australia across which it tracked. These parts of Australia had already experienced record rainfall totals prior to the arrival of Kelvin, with significant amounts being delivered by Tropical Cyclone Hilda, Tropical Cyclone Joyce, and Tropical Low 11U.

After Tropical Low 17U's formation, a tropical cyclone watch was issued for residents between Kuri Bay and Whim Creek, while a blue alert was issued for residents between Kuri Bay and Wallal, advising residents to be prepared for the upcoming storm. On the next day, Kununurra received 100 mm (3.9 in) of rain and Wyndham received gusts of 80 km/h (50 mph).

Prior to Kelvin's landfall, as it was hugging the coast at the time, Australian authorities issued a yellow alert in the area between Broome and Pardo Roadhouse, which advised residents to take shelter as soon as possible. Sustained gales were recorded north of Broome Port from 11:16 am to 2:11 pm AWST on 16 February. Broome Airport received 376.8 mm (14.8 in) of precipitation in the 24 hours prior to 9:00 am on 17 February, while West Roebuck received 370.0 mm (14.6 in) during this time. Around this time, Kelvin caused a house to be inundated with floodwater. Two wastewater plants overflowed, causing the Water Corporation to issue bans on fishing and swimming at Roebuck Bay and Dampier Creek. By 09:00 am on the next day, Nita Downs received 235.0 mm (9.25 in) and Wallal Downs received 223.5 mm (8.8 in) of rain. A red alert was issued for the residents from Bidyadanga to Sandfire, Western Australia as Cyclone Kelvin made landfall on 18 February, which ordered residents to go into shelters immediately. A cattle farmer reported property damage estimated to be AUS$150,000. By 9:00 am on 19 February, Broome recorded a record annual rainfall total of 1506.0 mm (59.3 in), despite being less than two months into the calendar year. In addition to the heavy precipitation, Kelvin also generated a 0.5 metre (1.6 foot) storm surge at Broome Port, and higher-than-normal ocean tides were recorded in Cable Beach. The heavy rainfall caused the already saturated water catchments in the region to overflow, and significant flooding ensued in areas such as Broome, Roebuck Plains, Logue River, Kalumburu and along the Great Northern Highway.

CIMMS microwave image of Cyclone Kelvin making landfall.

Fallen trees and property damages were reported at Anna Plains Station and Nita Downs, where the cyclone made landfall. Minor damages was also reported in Broome as well. Infrastructural damage in excess of AUS$16 million (US$12.7 million) also occurred along the Great Northern Highway due to the heavy rainfall and flooding. The flooding caused some parts of the highway to be closed, especially between Broome and Roebuck Plains, as well as between Willare and Sandfire roadhouses. The closure cut off the supply chain between towns in Kimberley and caused shortages of food supplies in the region. Repairs were estimated to take months, due to repeated impacts from previous cyclones, which weakened road infrastructure. A bridge along the highway across the Logue River that had been damaged by previous cyclones was overtopped by flooding yet again, setting back progress in repairing the bridge and lengthening its closure. Initial repairs to the bridge ultimately cost AUS$2 million, and permanent repairs were estimated to cost AUS$16 million. Due to flooding, a man was stranded in Eco Beach Resort and had to be airlifted. More than half of Mandora Station was inundated by flooding.

Even as Kelvin weakened to a tropical low, thunderstorms impacted southern parts of the state. Cascade received 106 mm (4.2 in) of rainfall, Scaddan received 85 mm (3.3 in), Grass Patch 65 mm (2.5 in), and parts of Esperance about 50 mm (2 in). Overall, Cyclone Kelvin in caused an estimated AUS$25 million ($25 million in 2018 USD) in losses throughout Australia.

In the aftermath of the storm, floodwaters quickly hampered the relief efforts to the areas impacted by the cyclone. Western Australia Department of Fire & Emergency Services had to charter a plane and dropped supplies from the plane to the Aboriginal Australians in Dampier Peninsula and Anna Plains Station as part of disaster assistance efforts. These efforts, which were jointly funded by the Australian federal government and state government of Western Australia, were made available to Laverton, Wyndham–East Kimberley, Derby–West Kimberley and Broome local government areas. Volunteers from State Emergency Service (SES) also took charter planes to assist efforts in Eighty Mile Beach region.

== See also ==
- Weather of 2017 and 2018
- Tropical cyclones in 2017 and 2018
- 2018 Broome flood
- Cyclone Rusty (2013) - the previous severe tropical cyclone to make landfall between Broome and Port Hedland.
- Cyclone Christine (2013-14)
- Cyclone Emma (2006)
- Cyclone Ilsa (2023) - the next severe tropical cyclone to make landfall between Broome and Port Hedland.
