= 2017–18 Australian region cyclone season =

Tropical cyclone season

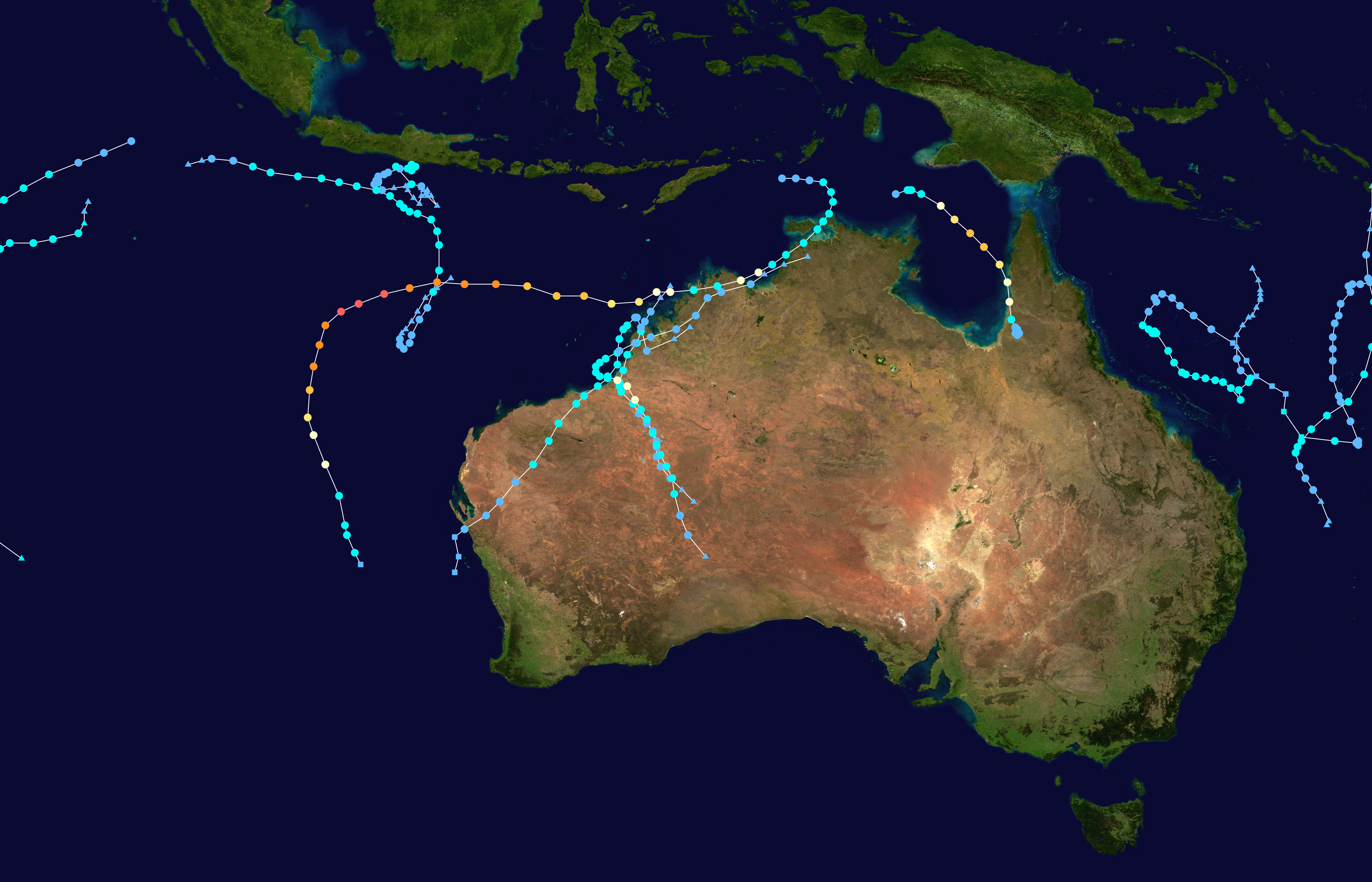
- Season summary map

Seasonal boundaries
- First system formed: 8 August 2017
- Last system dissipated: 28 April 2018

Strongest storm
- Name: Marcus
  - Maximum winds: 250 km/h (155 mph) (10-minute sustained)
  - Lowest pressure: 905 hPa (mbar)

Seasonal statistics
- Tropical lows: 23
- Tropical cyclones: 11
- Severe tropical cyclones: 3
- Total fatalities: 41 total
- Total damage: $249 million (2018 USD)

Related articles
- 2017–18 South-West Indian Ocean cyclone season; 2017–18 South Pacific cyclone season

The 2017–18 Australian region cyclone season was an average period of tropical cyclone formation in the Southern Indian Ocean and South Pacific Ocean, between 90°E and 160°E, with 11 named storms, which 3 intensified into severe tropical cyclones. Another two tropical cyclones, Cempaka (Indonesian region north of 10°S) and Flamboyan (Indonesian and La Réunion's area of responsibility) occurred outside the Australian region but are included in the descriptions below. The season officially began 1 November 2017 and ended on 30 April 2018; however, tropical cyclones can form at any time of the year, as demonstrated by the first tropical low of the season in early August. Any tropical system that forms between 1 July 2017 and 30 June 2018 will count towards the season total. During the season, tropical cyclones will be officially monitored by one of the five tropical cyclone warning centres (TCWCs) that operate in this region. Three of the five centres are operated by the Australian Bureau of Meteorology (BOM) in Perth, Darwin and Brisbane, while the other two are operated by the National Weather Service of Papua New Guinea in Port Moresby and the Indonesian Agency for Meteorology, Climatology and Geophysics in Jakarta. The Joint Typhoon Warning Center (JTWC) of the United States and other national meteorological services, including Météo-France at Réunion, also monitored the basin during the season.

== Seasonal forecasts ==
Region	Average number	Chance of more	Chance of less	Actual activity
Whole	11	56%	44%	11
Western	7	52%	48%	4
North-Western	5	56%	44%	4
Northern	3	53%	47%	2
Eastern	4	54%	46%	2
Source: BOM's Seasonal Outlooks for Tropical Cyclones.

During October, ahead of the tropical cyclone season, the Bureau of Meteorology issued a tropical cyclone outlook for the coming 2017–18 season, which would officially run from 1 November 2017 to 30 April 2018. Seasonal forecasts were issued for the basin as a whole, as well as the Eastern, Northern and Western regions and the North-Western sub-region. The forecasts took into account various factors, including the latest neutral to weak La Niña conditions that had been observed in the tropical Pacific Ocean. The outlooks showed that activity in the basin overall, as well as for each of its individual regions, would be near average. For the Western region between 90°E and 125°E, the BOM forecast that the area would also see activity slightly above its average of 7, with a 52% chance of an above average number of tropical cyclones occurring. TCWC Perth also noted that there was a likelihood of two tropical cyclones and a significant likelihood of at least one severe tropical cyclone impacting Western Australia. For the North-Western sub-region between 105°E and 130°E, it was predicted that activity would be above average, with a 56% chance of above-average tropical cyclone activity. The Northern Territory, which was defined as being between as being 125°E and 142.5°E, had a 53% chance of an above-average season. The Eastern region between 142.5°E and 160°E was predicted to have a slightly above-normal tropical cyclone season, with a 54% chance of above-average tropical cyclone activity.

== Systems ==
=== Tropical Low 01U ===
- Tropical low (Australian scale)
- Duration: 8 August – 8 August
- Peak intensity: 30 km/h (20 mph) (10-min); 1005 hPa (mbar)

On 8 August, TCWC Perth started to monitor a tropical low located approximately 850 km (530 mi) to the west-northwest of the Cocos Islands, on the 90th meridian east—the western edge of the BOM's area of responsibility. The tropical low moved in a west-southwesterly direction and attained 35 km/h (20 mph) sustained winds south of the circulation center, and a minimum barometric pressure of 1005 hPa (29.68 inHg). The storm moved out of the Australian region on the same day.

=== Tropical Cyclone Cempaka ===
- Category 2 tropical cyclone (Australian scale)
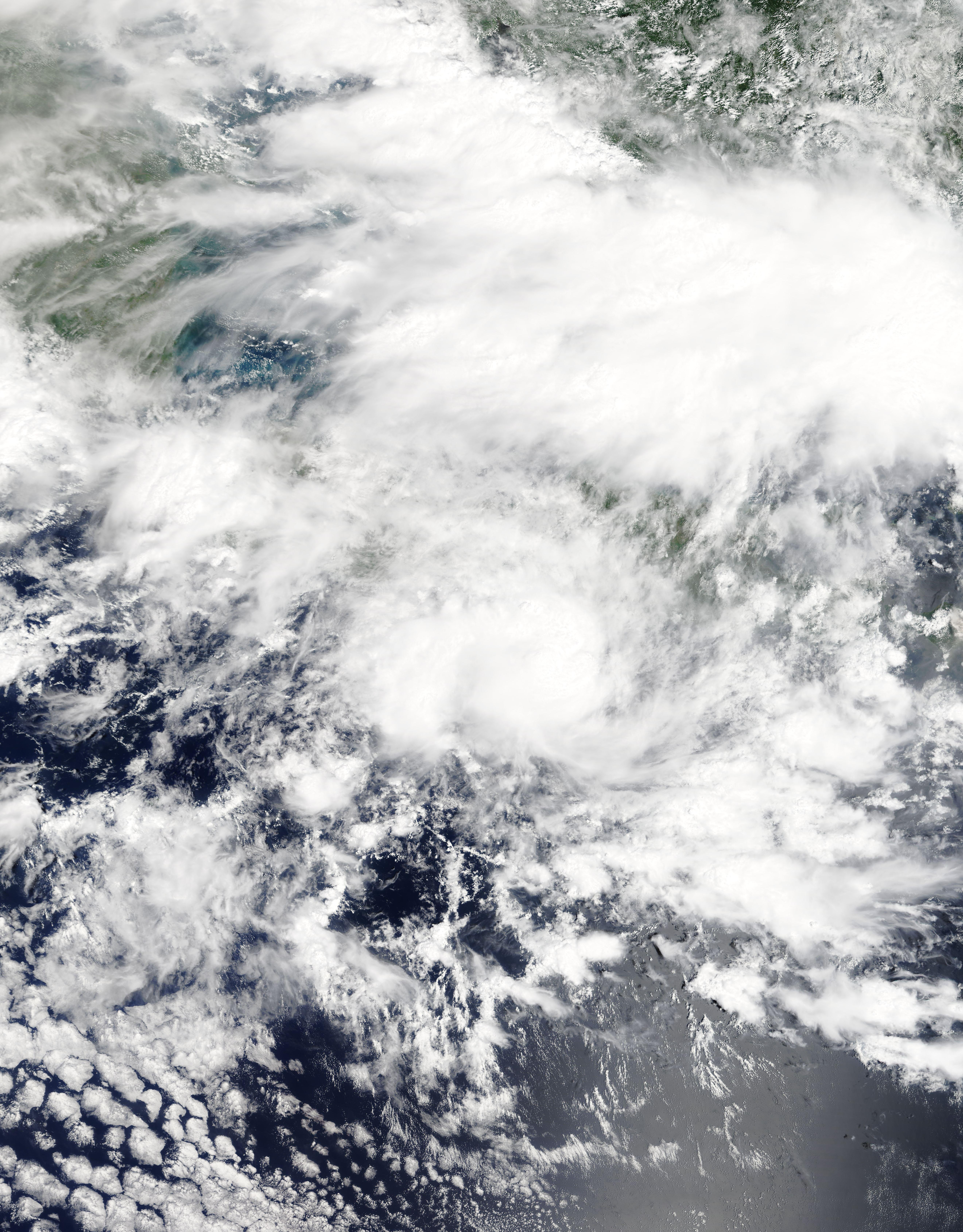
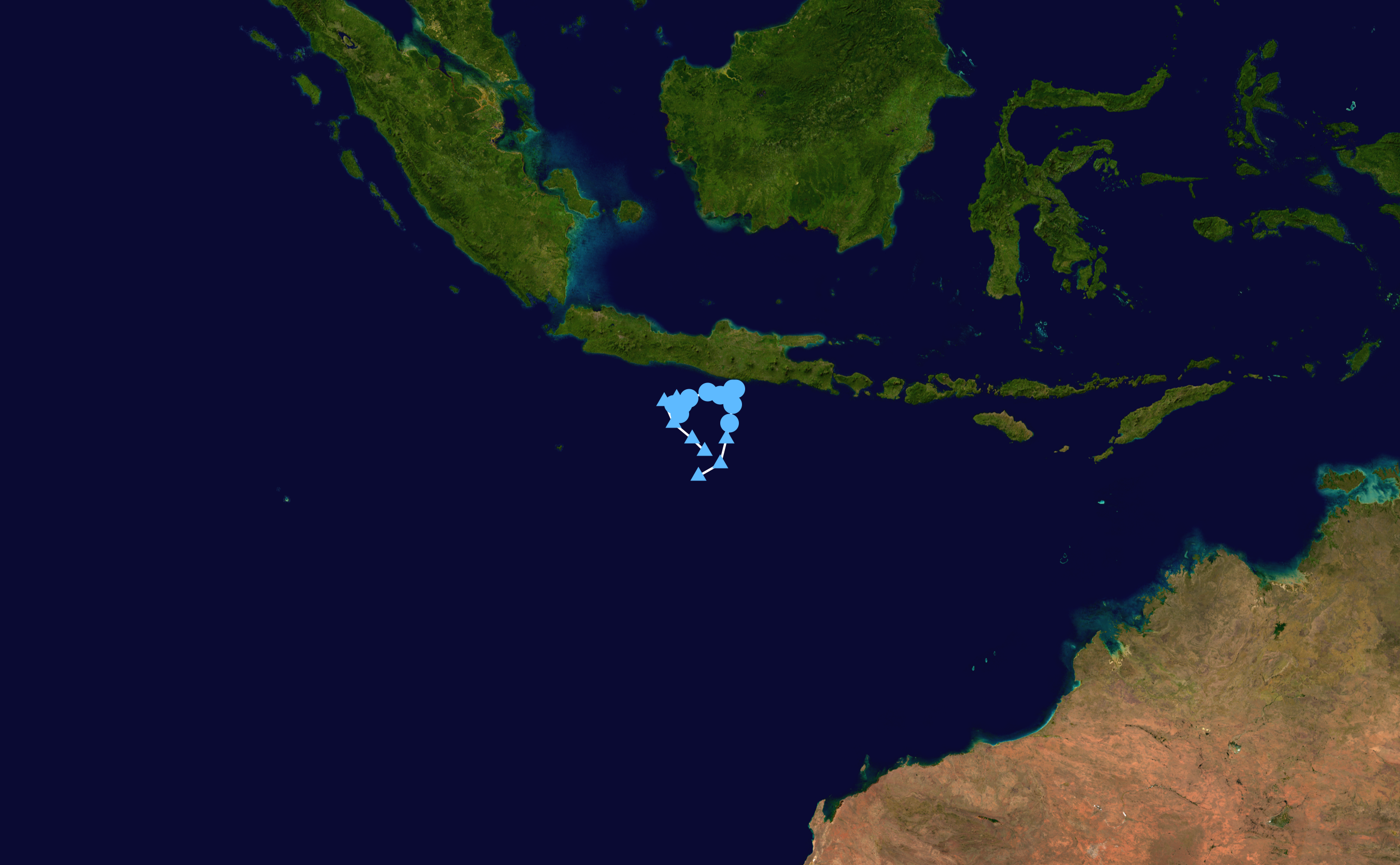
- Duration: 21 November – 29 November
- Peak intensity: 110 km/h (70 mph) (10-min); 990 hPa (mbar)

On 22 November, TCWC Perth and TCWC Jakarta started to monitor a weak tropical low that had developed about 332 km (206 mi) south of the city of Surabaya. By 06:00 UTC of 26 November, TCWC Jakarta began issuing advisories and was classified as a tropical depression. The JTWC, however, issued a Tropical Cyclone Formation Alert early on 27 November, stating that satellite imagery depicted flaring convection near its center. Several hours later, TCWC Jakarta upgraded the system to a tropical cyclone, giving the name Cempaka. Winds from the cyclone also blew ash from nearby Mount Agung on Bali westwards to its popular beaches and far eastern Java. On 30 November, Cempaka weakened into a tropical low, while turning to the southwest. TCWC Perth last mentioned Cempaka on 1 December.

Although Cempaka never made landfall, the rainfall from the storm caused severe flooding and landslides across the southern half of Java and Bali, killing at least 41 people and destroying many homes and businesses.

=== Tropical Low 04U ===
- Tropical low (Australian scale)
- Duration: 26 November – 29 November
- Peak intensity: Winds not specified; 1005 hPa (mbar)

On 24 November, TCWC Darwin started to monitor a weak tropical low that had developed in the Banda Sea. The system moved in a slow direction, and attained a minimum pressure of 1005 hPa, until it was last mentioned on 29 November.

=== Tropical Cyclone Dahlia ===
- Category 2 tropical cyclone (Australian scale)
- Tropical storm (SSHWS)
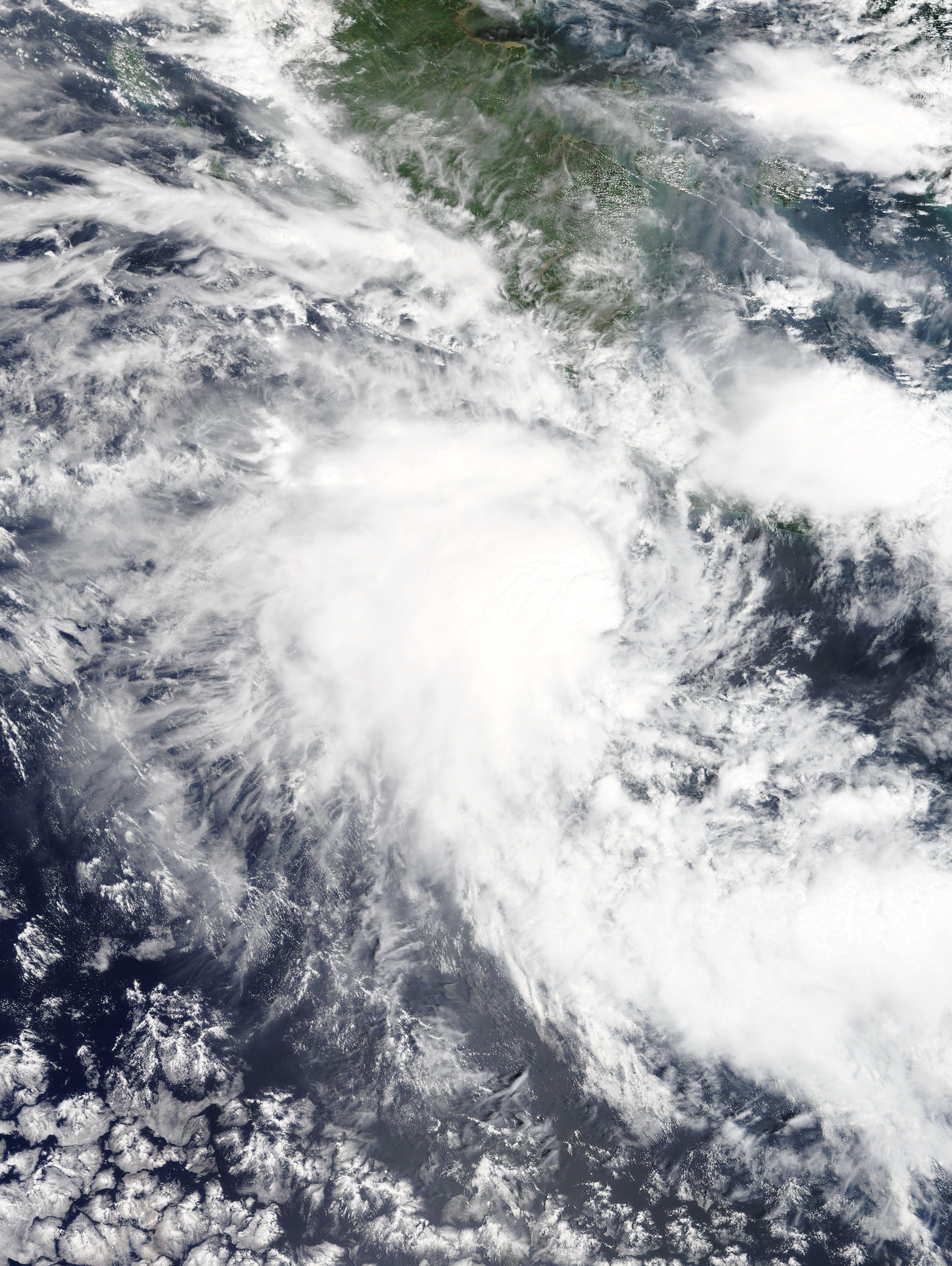
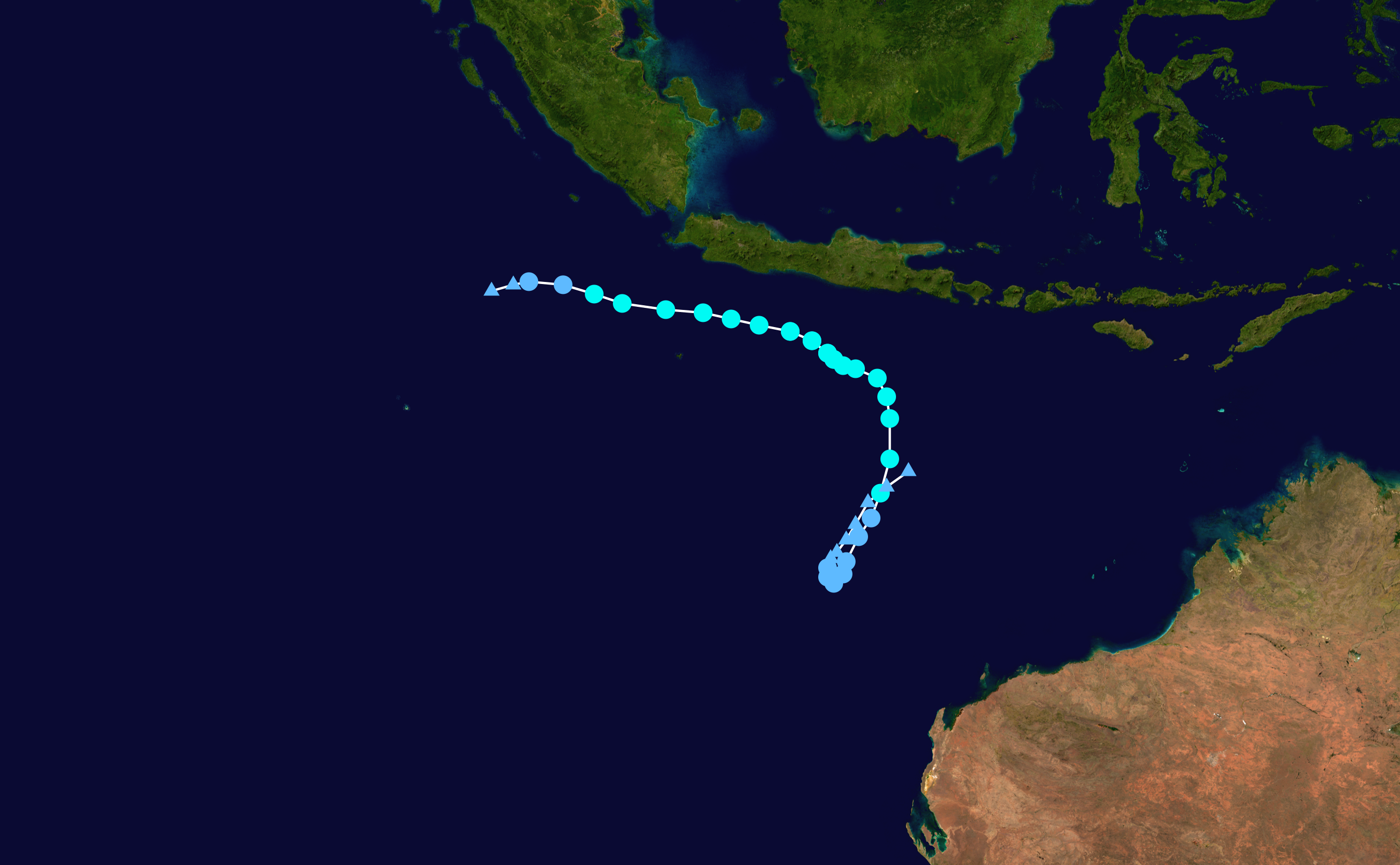
- Duration: 26 November – 4 December
- Peak intensity: 95 km/h (60 mph) (10-min); 987 hPa (mbar)

Tropical Low 03U was first noted as a tropical depression by TCWC Jakarta on 24 November, while it was located about 1,500 km (930 mi) to the west of Jakarta, Indonesia. By 29 November, TCWC Jakarta upgraded the system to a tropical cyclone, receiving the name Dahlia, making it the first time where at least two cyclones were formed and named by TCWC Jakarta in a single season. The JTWC followed suit the next day, designating the system as 01S. Best track reanalysis by the Bureau of Meteorology concluded that Dahlia reached tropical cyclone intensity as a Category 2, with sustained winds of 50 knots on 1 December and a minimum barometric pressure of 985 hPa. Dahlia maintained its intensity for several hours until the storm moved southeastwards and began to rapidly weaken on 2 December as it interacted with Ex-Tropical Cyclone Cempaka. Dahlia briefly reintensified for a period on 3 December. The BoM later issued its final bulletin on Dahlia early on 4 December. TCWC Perth last monitored on Dahlia on 5 December.

=== Tropical Cyclone Hilda ===
- Category 2 tropical cyclone (Australian scale)
- Tropical storm (SSHWS)
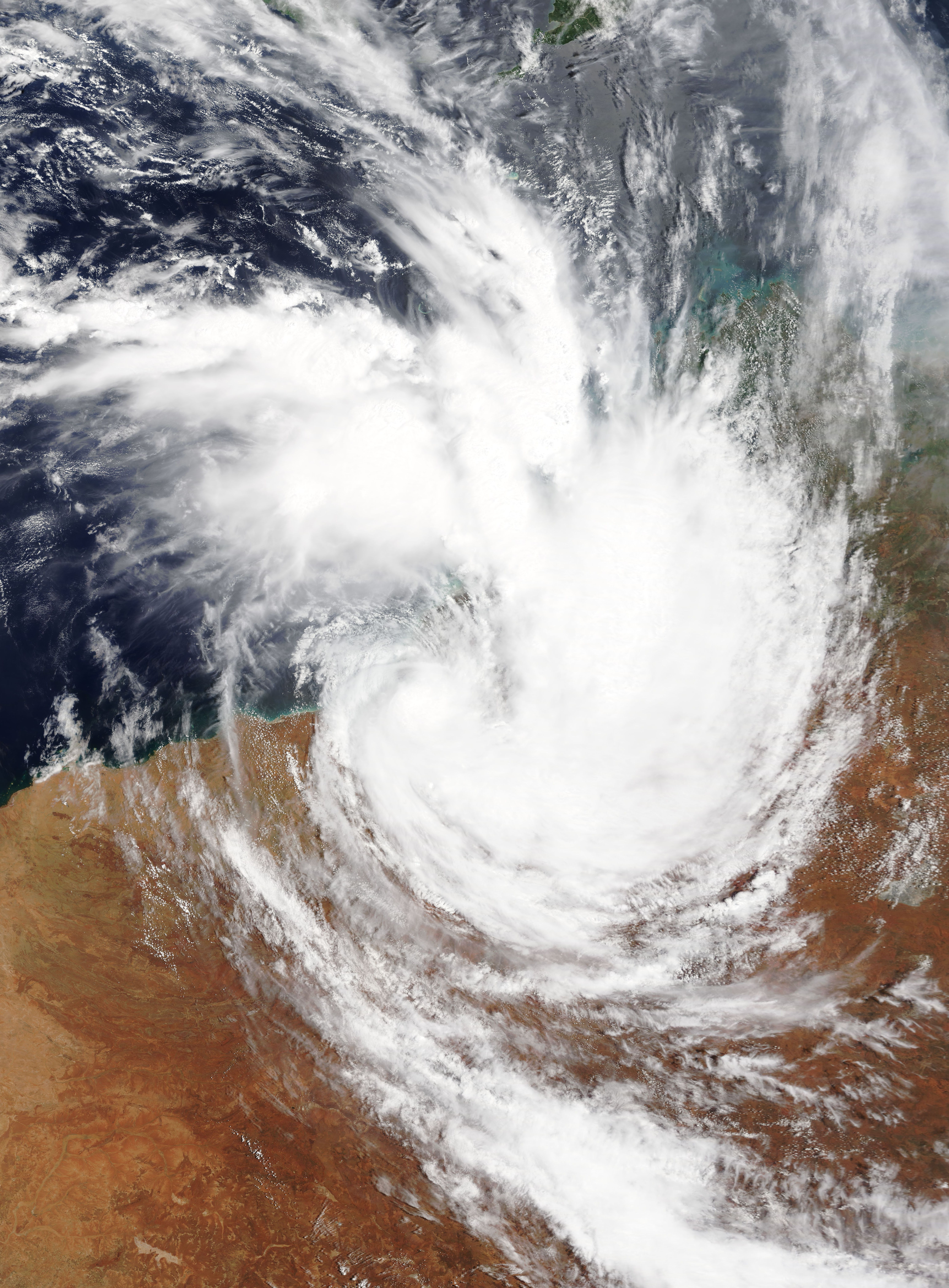
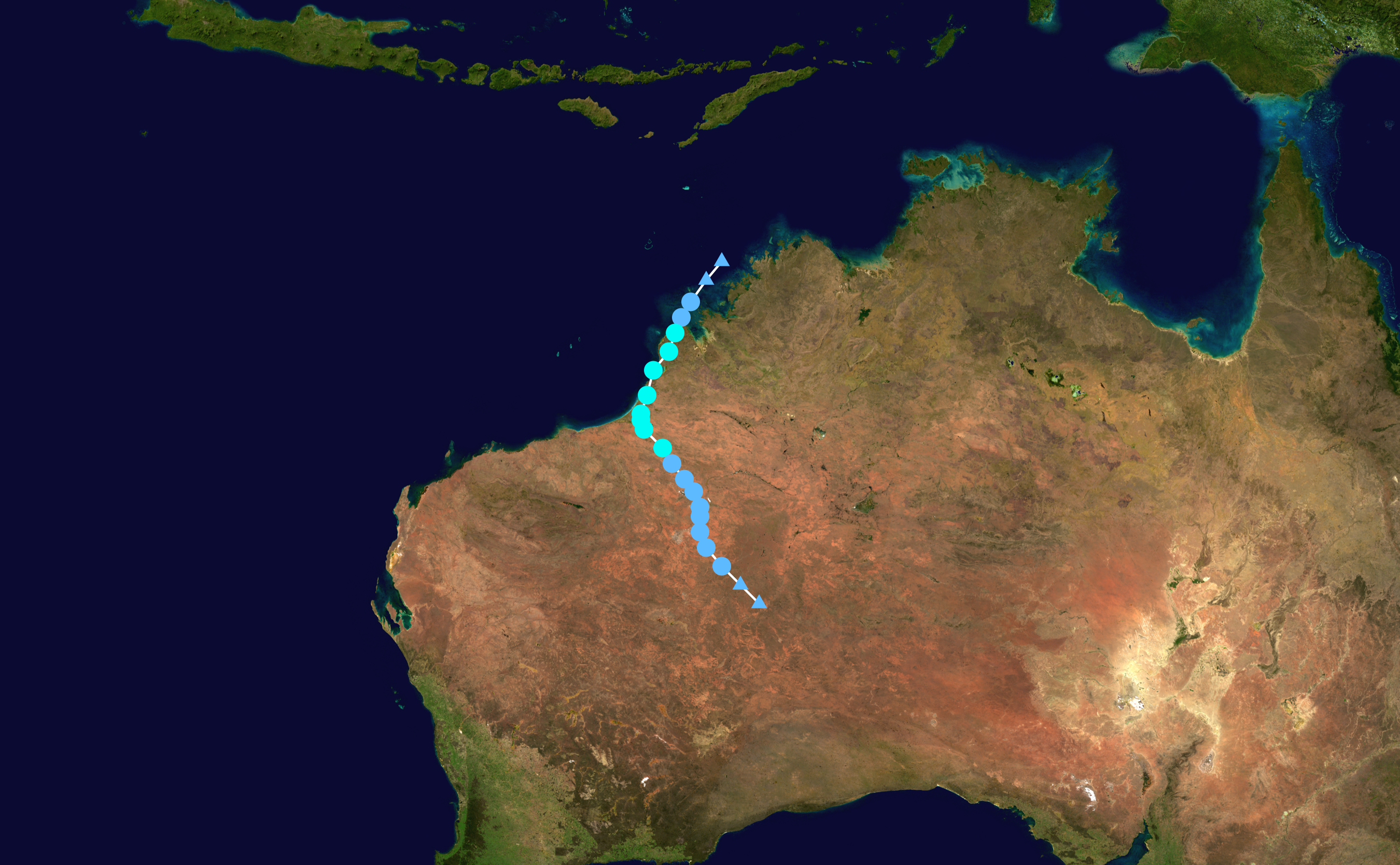
- Duration: 26 December – 29 December
- Peak intensity: 100 km/h (65 mph) (10-min); 980 hPa (mbar)

During 26 December, the BoM reported that a tropical low had developed just off the Kimberley coast, about 330 km (205 mi) to the north of Derby. The system subsequently moved south-southwest parallel to the coast, as it developed further before it moved overland to the southwest of Cape Leveque. The system was subsequently classified as a Category 1 tropical cyclone on 27 December and named Hilda by the BoM, while it was located inland near Broome based on reports of persistent gale-force winds from Broome Airport. Soon back over water, the system strengthened more, and was classified as a Category 2 tropical cyclone with 10-minute peak windspeeds of 95 km/h (60 mph). Late that same day, Hilda made a second and final landfall just north of Bidyadanga at near peak intensity. Inland, the cyclone moved south-southeastward, weakening into a tropical low by the afternoon of 28 December, and then dissipating the following day. Overall, Hilda caused only minor damage as it moved through western Kimberley.

=== Tropical Cyclone Irving ===
- Category 1 tropical cyclone (Australian scale)
- Tropical storm (SSHWS)
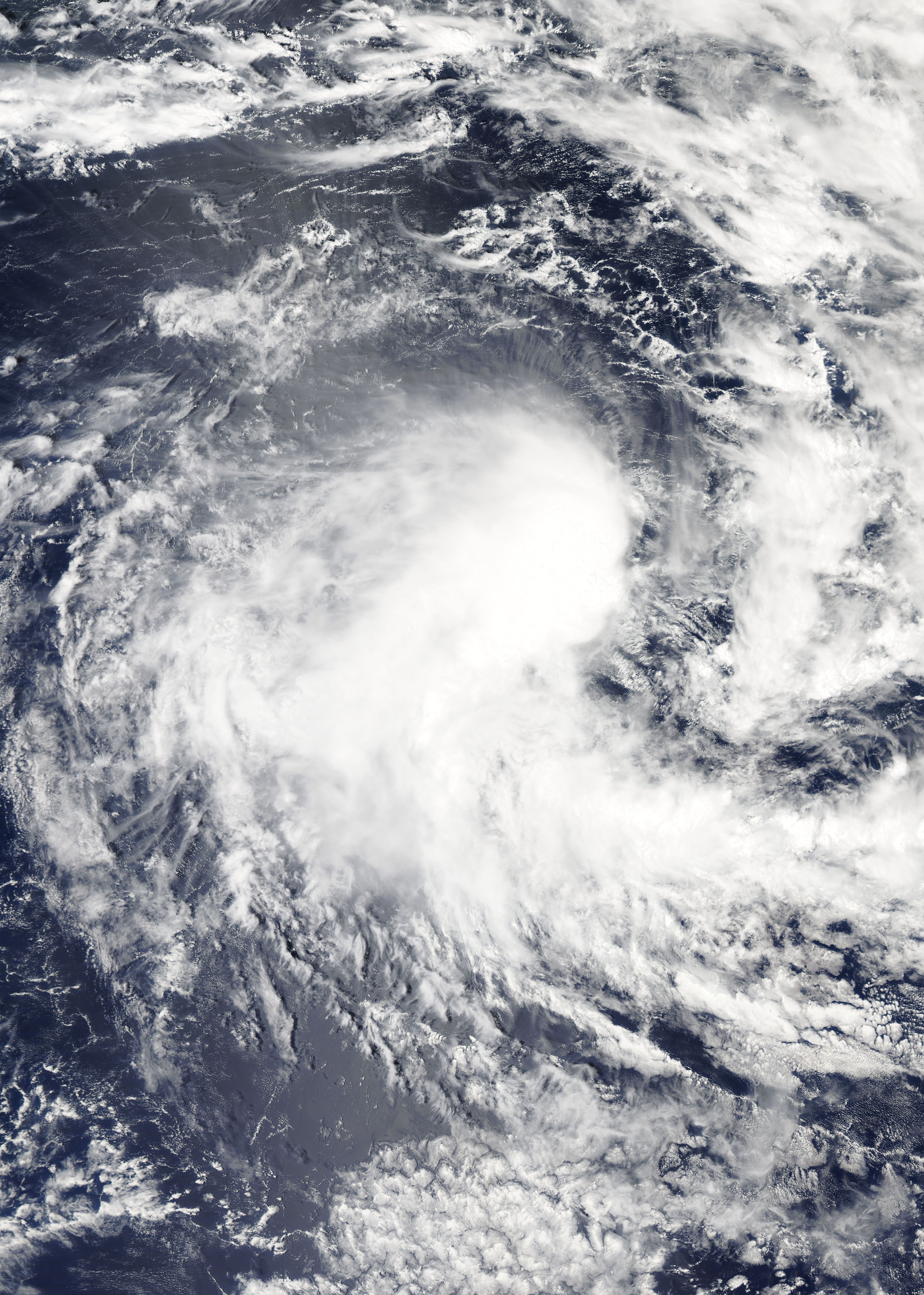
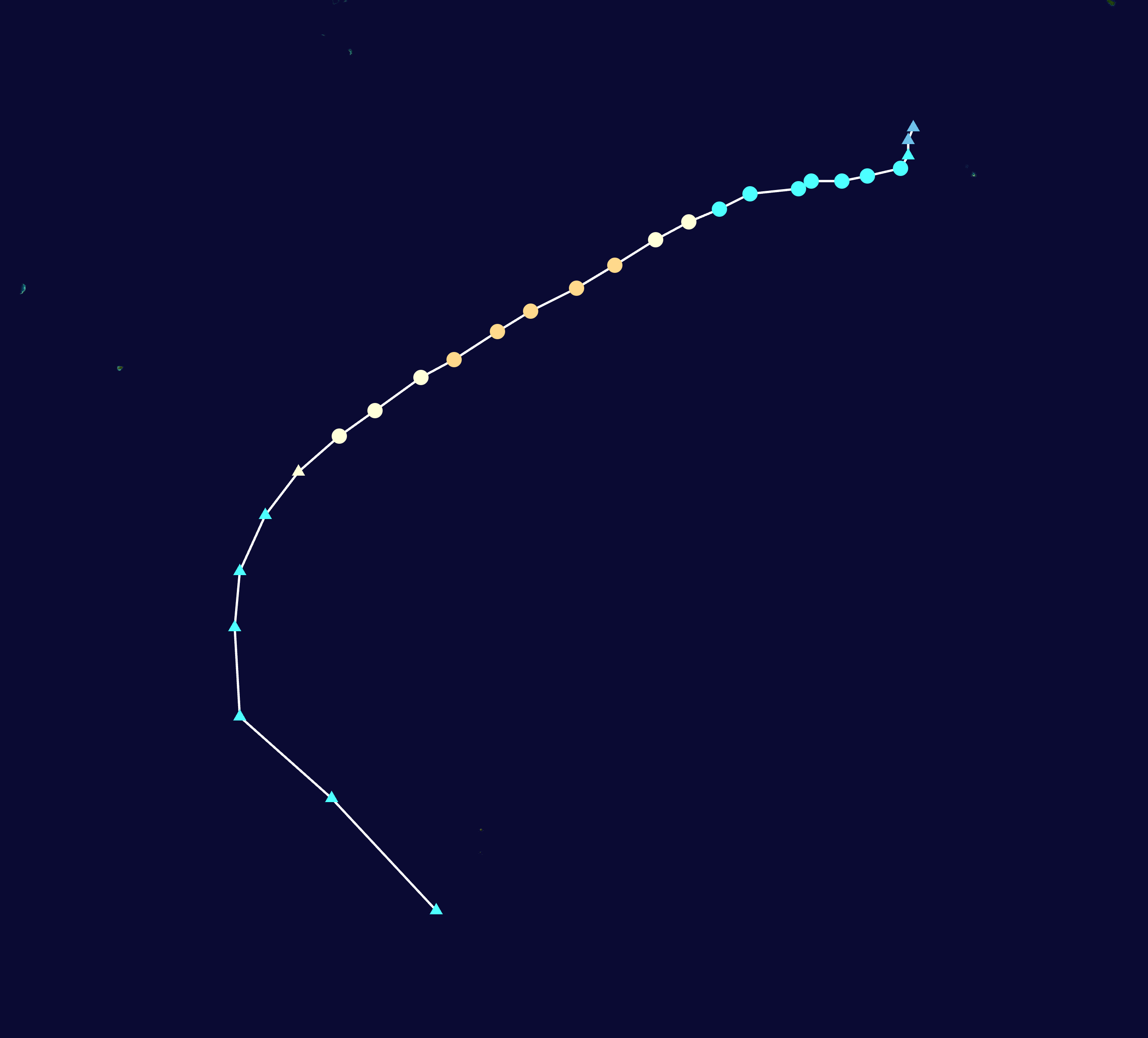
- Duration: 3 January – 6 January (Exited basin)
- Peak intensity: 75 km/h (45 mph) (10-min); 993 hPa (mbar)

On 3 January, a tropical low had developed to the southwest of Sumatra. On 06:00 UTC of 5 January, TCWC Perth began issuing advisories on the system, using the identifier 08U. TCWC Perth had recorded winds of 75 km/h (45 mph), despite the fact that the system did not have the structure of a tropical cyclone. By the next day, 08U then strengthened into a Category 1 tropical cyclone, with the storm receiving the name Irving, the fourth named storm of the season. Three hours later, the JTWC followed suit and gave the system the designation 04S. TCWC Perth, however, discontinued advisories after Irving exited the basin on 12:00 UTC the same day.

=== Tropical Cyclone Joyce ===
- Category 2 tropical cyclone (Australian scale)
- Tropical storm (SSHWS)
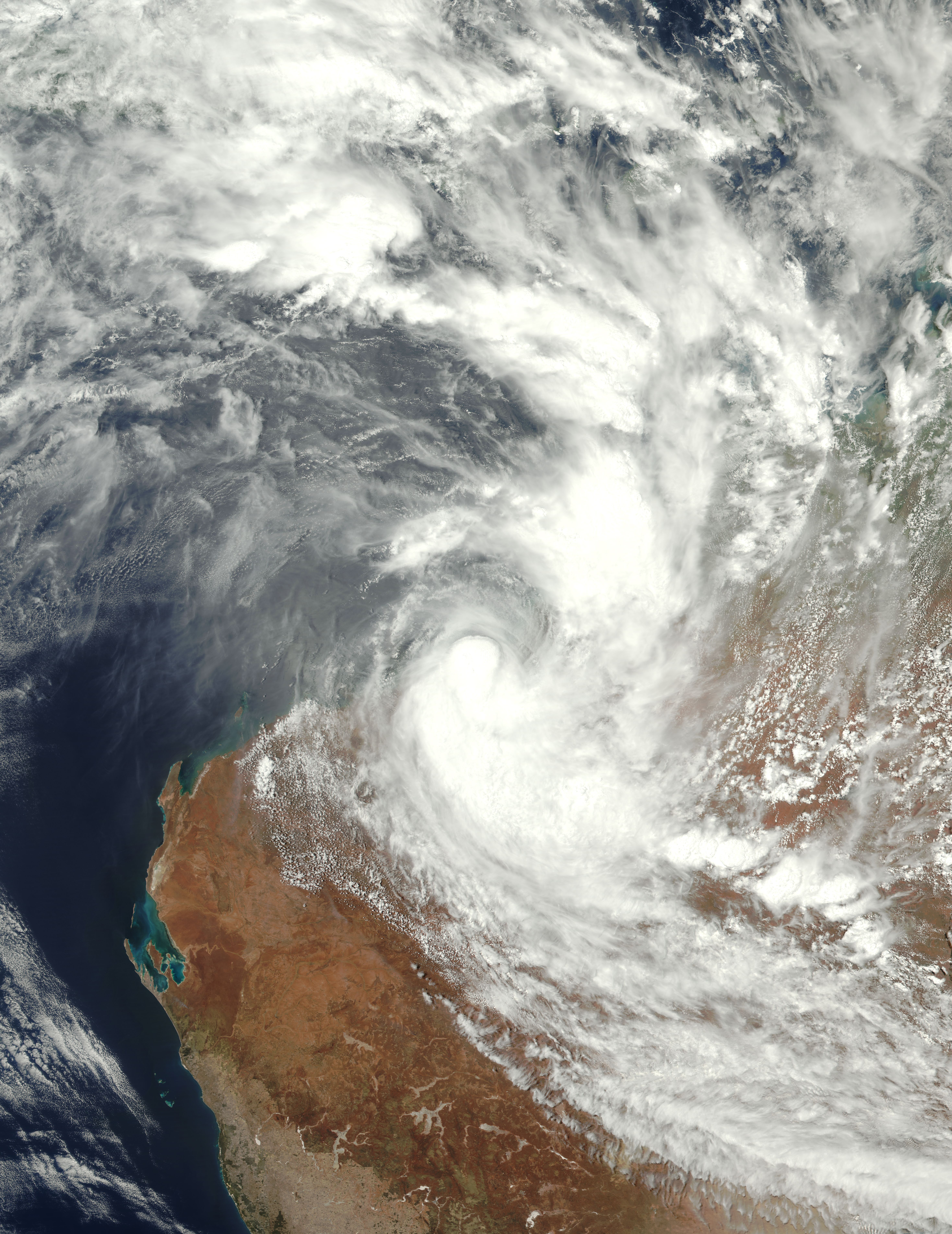
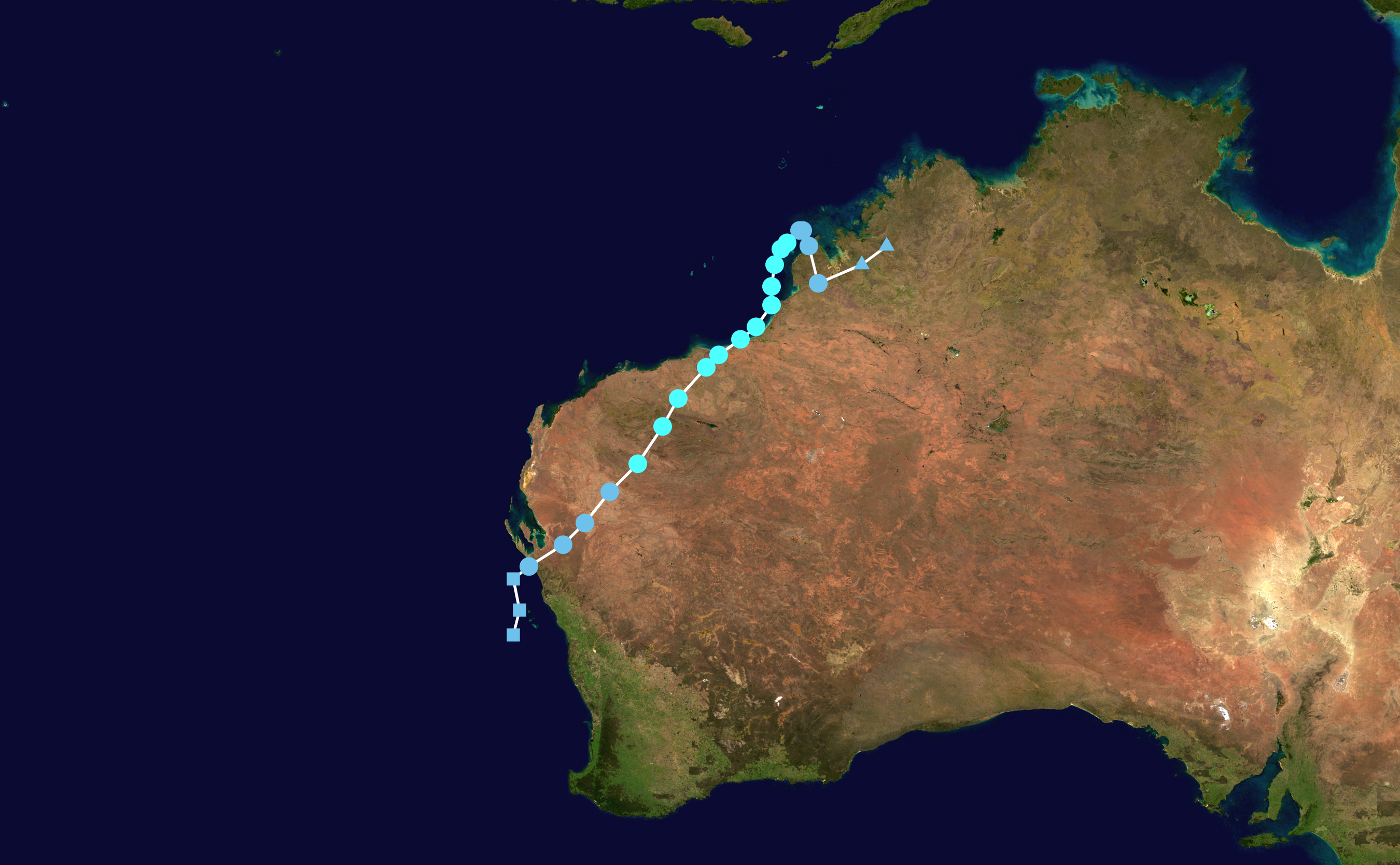
- Duration: 7 January – 13 January
- Peak intensity: 95 km/h (60 mph) (10-min); 975 hPa (mbar)

A tropical low developed over the Joseph Bonaparte Gulf on 7 January 2018, and moved over the Kimberley region of Western Australia the next day. On 10 January, the low moved offshore and began to develop, and the system was upgraded to a tropical cyclone, named Joyce, on 11 January. The system made landfall on the Western Australian coast the following day. The remnants of Cyclone Joyce bought heavy rain to the Perth Metro Area on 15 January; a total of 96 mm (3.8 in) of rain in 24 hours fell in Perth, while Rottnest Island recorded the highest amount of rain in the metro, which was a total of 142 mm (5.6 in).

=== Tropical Low 11U ===
- Tropical low (Australian scale)
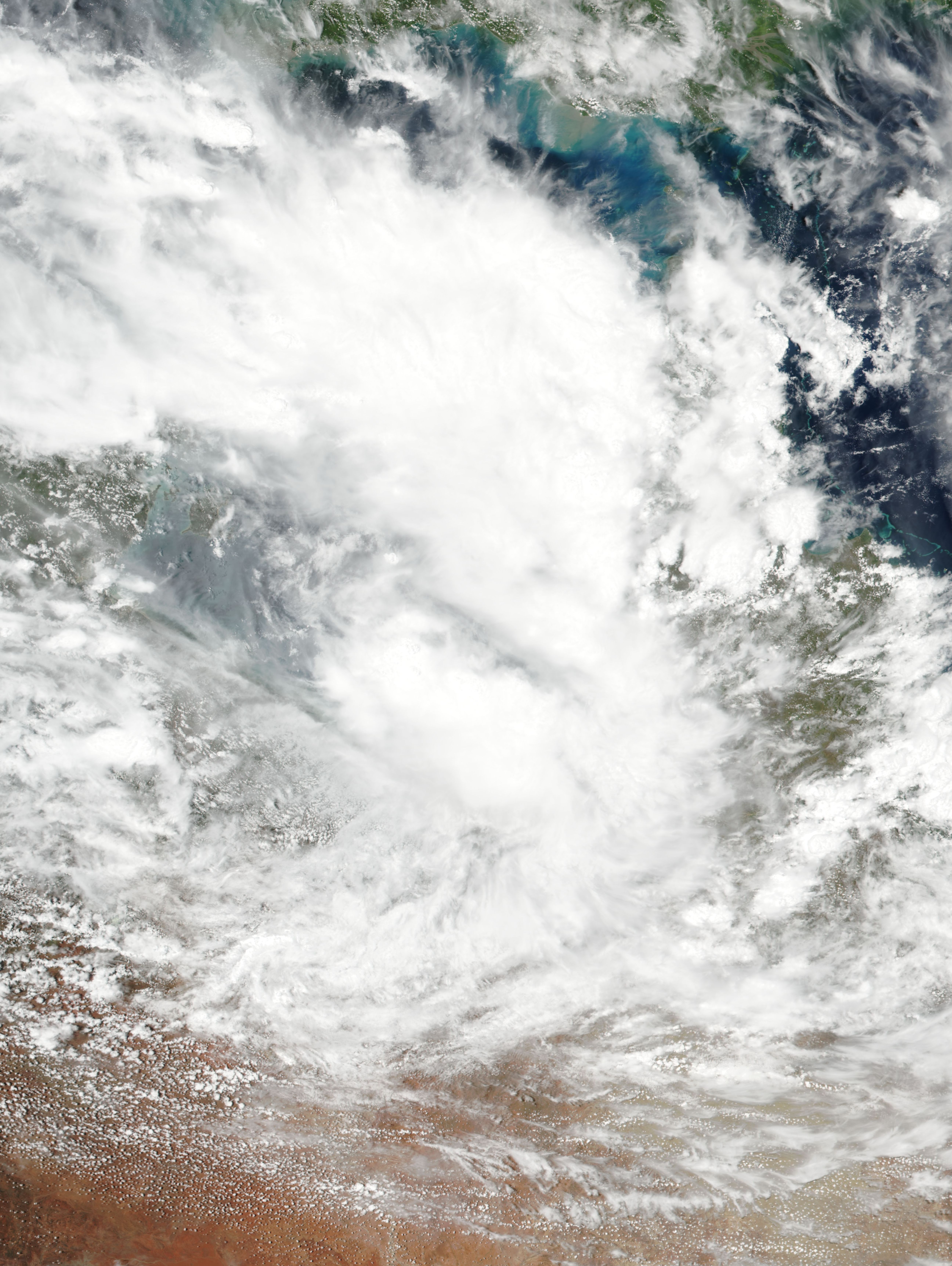
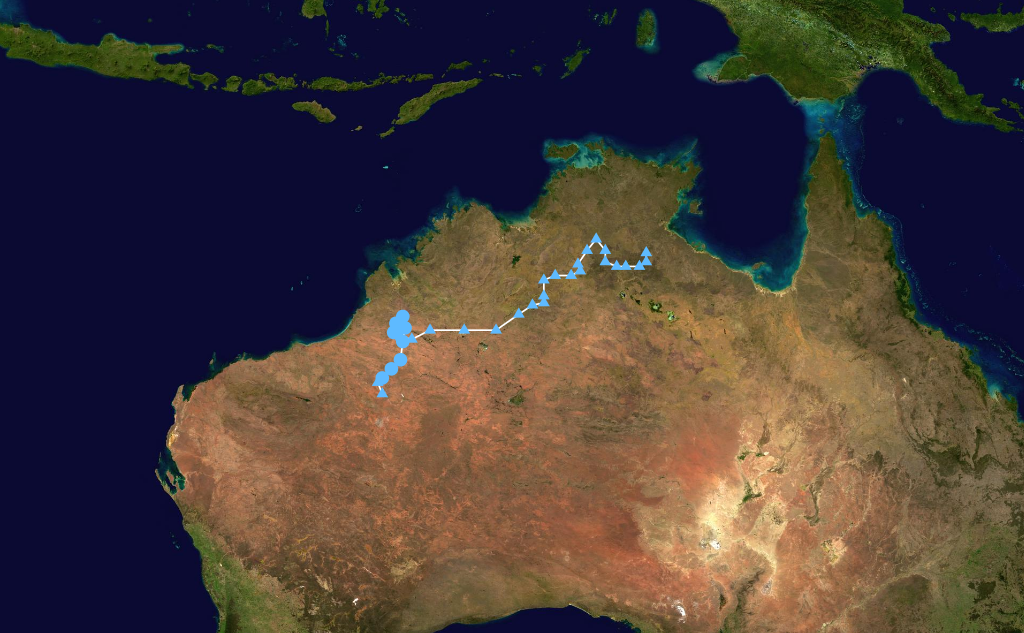
- Duration: 20 January – 1 February
- Peak intensity: 75 km/h (45 mph) (10-min); 985 hPa (mbar)

The slow-moving system brought copious rains to a broad swath of coastal Australia. In Kimberley, Western Australia, near-record rainfall accumulations of 639 mm (25.2 in) in four days caused extensive flooding. In a 24-hour span, 439 mm (17.3 in) of rain fell across Broome, Western Australia, with flood waters in some areas reaching depths of 1.2 to 1.5 m (4 to 5 ft). Portions of the Great Northern Highway and Cape Leveque road were closed. Coastal areas experienced powerful winds reaching 100 km/h (60 mph) with gusts to 125 km/h (78 mph); these winds downed many trees and power lines. The effects of the low were considered substantially worse than Hilda and Joyce, tropical cyclones that affected the same region earlier in the season.

=== Severe Tropical Cyclone Kelvin ===
- Category 3 severe tropical cyclone (Australian scale)
- Category 1 tropical cyclone (SSHWS)
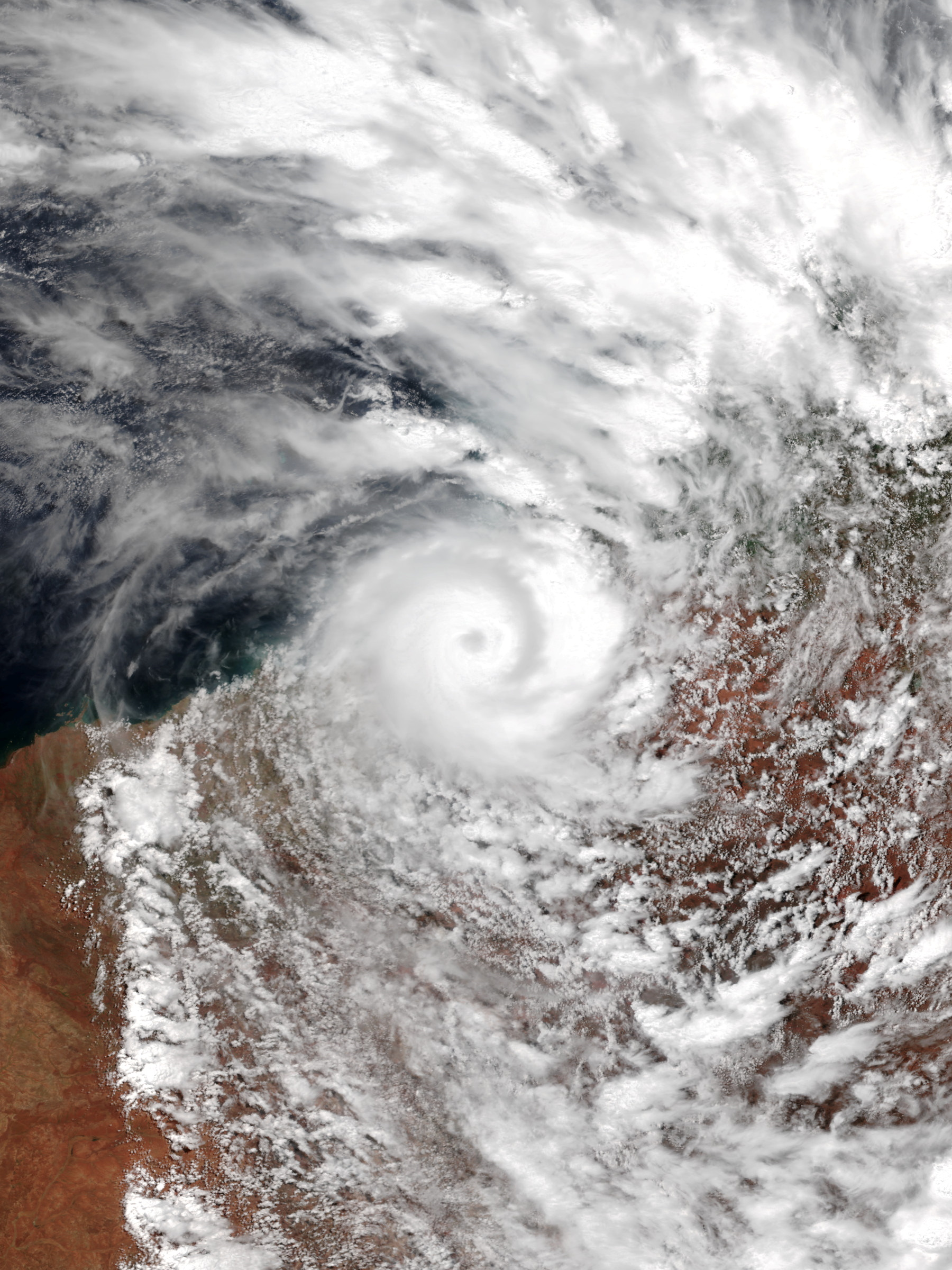
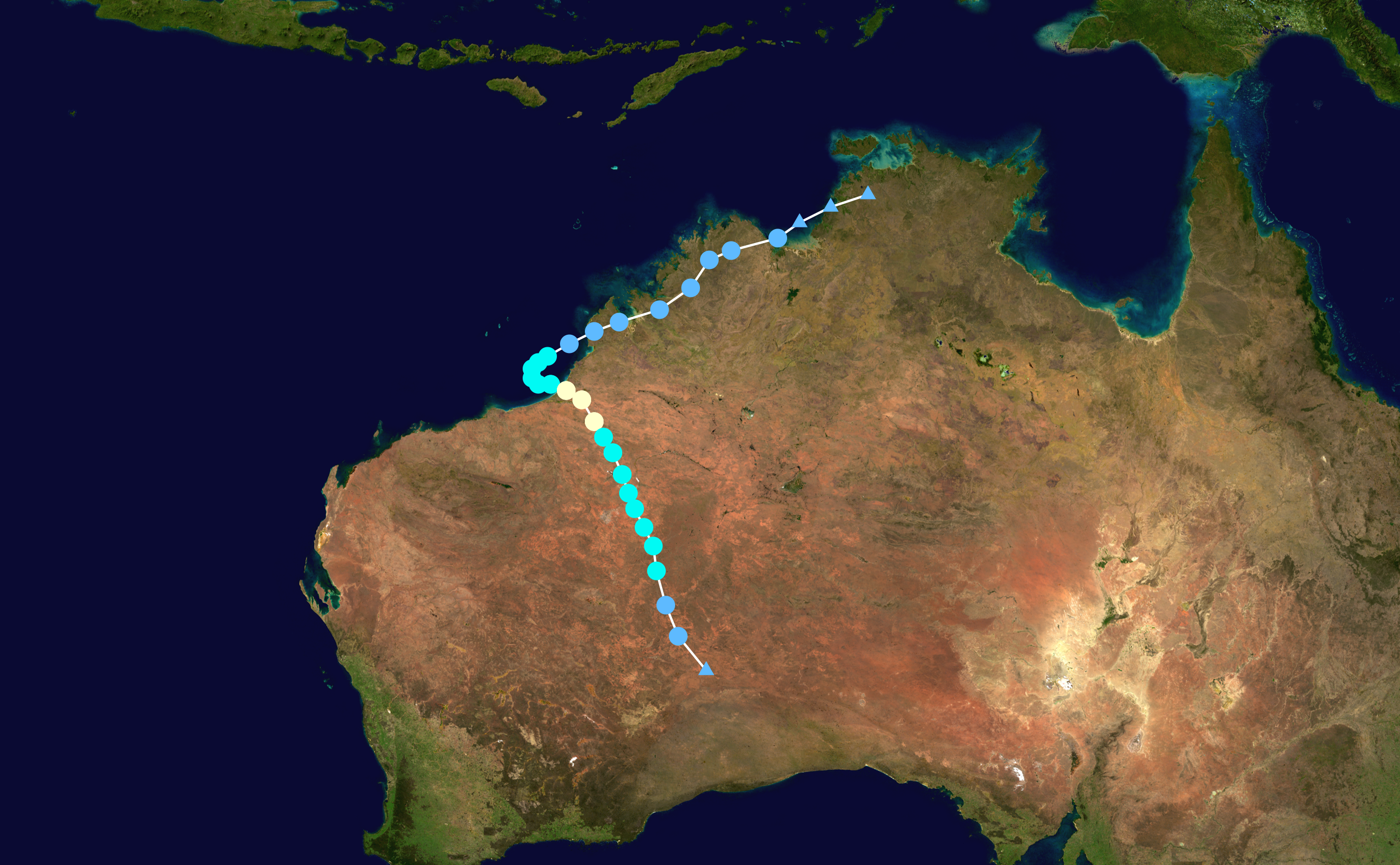
- Duration: 11 February – 21 February
- Peak intensity: 150 km/h (90 mph) (10-min); 955 hPa (mbar)

Tropical Cyclone Kelvin formed on 12 February and rapidly intensified into a Category 2 Storm (Australian Scale) and a Category 1 Storm (Saffir–Simpson) Kelvin made landfall, but unusually formed an eye over land. Kelvin sustained cyclone or hurricane intensity until dissipating on 20 February. Tropical Cyclone Kelvin brought widespread heavy rainfall to the Kimberley region which had already been saturated by other tropical cyclone systems. As a result, significant flooding occurred in parts of the Kimberley, including in the towns of Broome and Bidyadanga. Property damage was sustained at Broome and Anna Plains Station, where the cyclone made landfall, as well as infrastructural damage to the Great Northern Highway as a result of the heavy rainfall and flooding.

=== Tropical Cyclone Linda ===
- Category 2 tropical cyclone (Australian scale)
- Tropical storm (SSHWS)
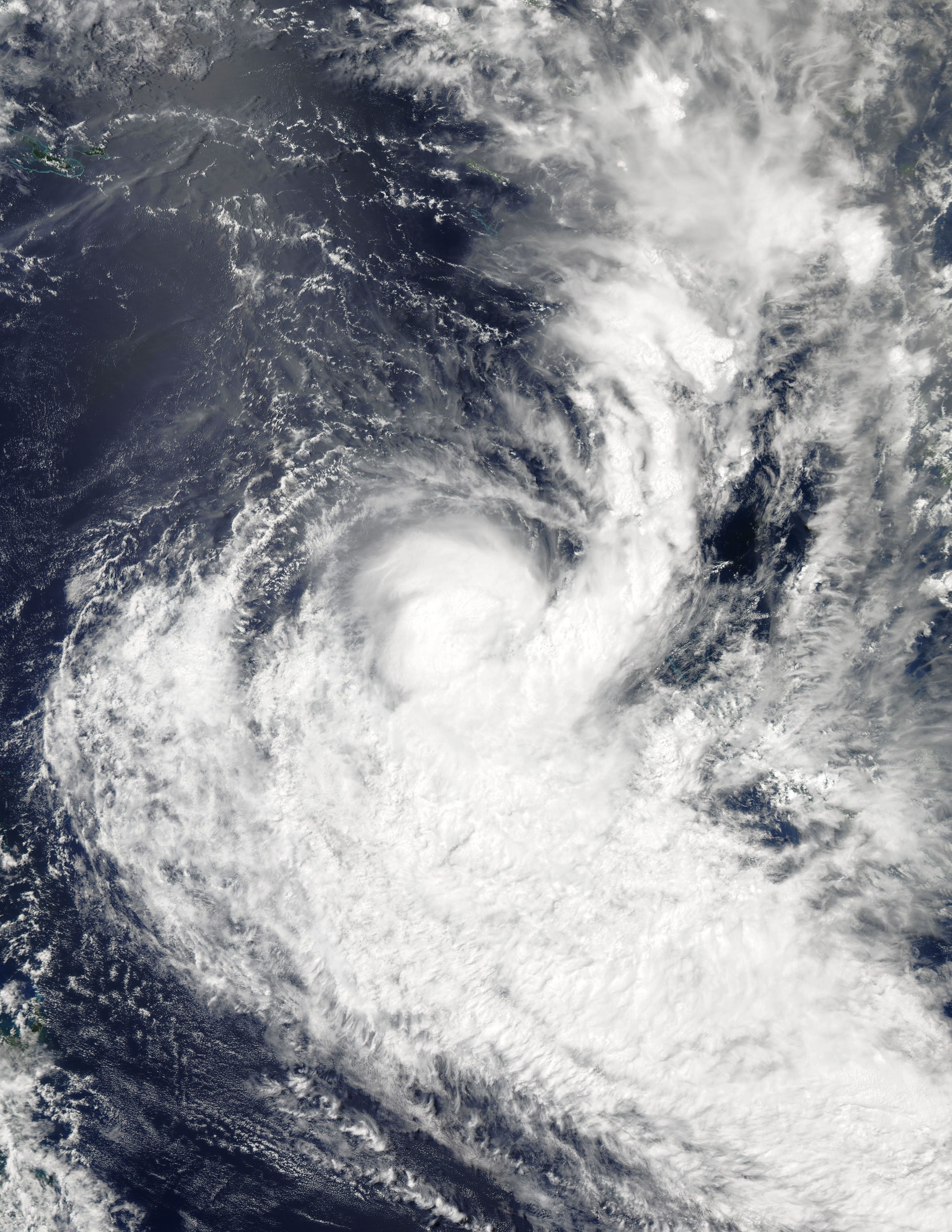
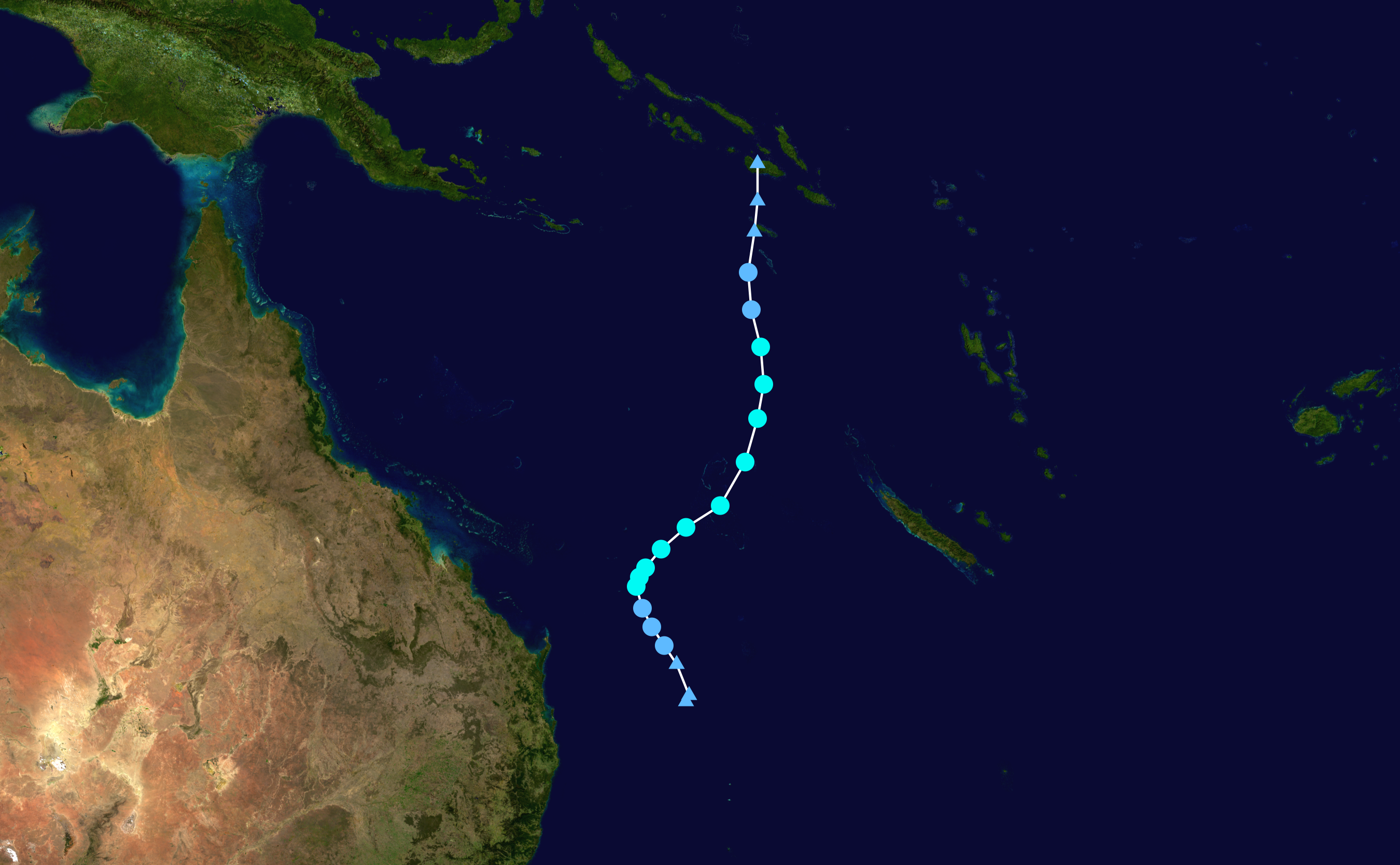
- Duration: 11 March – 16 March
- Peak intensity: 95 km/h (60 mph) (10-min); 987 hPa (mbar)

On 11 March, the Fiji Meteorological Service reported that Tropical Disturbance 10F had developed about 85 km (55 mi) to the southwest of Rennell and Bellona Province of the Solomon Islands. The system was poorly organised, with atmospheric convection displaced to the east of the low-level circulation centre. On the morning of 12 March, following some mild strengthening, the JTWC upgraded the disturbance to a tropical depression, and the Bureau of Meteorology assigned the system the tropical low designation 21U. Late the same day, the JTWC assessed the system to be producing gale-force winds, and upgraded it to tropical storm status on the Saffir–Simpson scale. The storm moved generally southwards and entered the Australian region at 10:00 AEST on 13 March. Despite being exposed to generally unfavourable atmospheric conditions for tropical cyclone development, the tropical low strengthened into a category 1 tropical cyclone on the Australian scale six hours later. The storm was named "Linda", and was the first tropical cyclone in the Eastern Region for the 2017–18 season. Tropical Cyclone Linda attained its peak intensity at 22:00 AEST 13 March, with 75 km/h (45 mph) 10-minute sustained winds, 95 km/h (60 mph) one-minute sustained winds, and a minimum atmospheric pressure of 993 hPa (29.32 inHg).

A few hours later, the storm assumed a more southwesterly course towards the southern Queensland coast. As a result of the further deteriorating atmospheric conditions and cooling sea surface temperatures due to movement away from warm equatorial waters, Linda weakened to a subtropical low during mid-morning on 14 March, having spent fewer than 24 hours as a cyclone. The JTWC proceeded to downgrade the system below tropical storm intensity at 04:00 AEST on 25 March. The remnant low transitioned to a south-southeasterly track and continued to decay while travelling roughly parallel to the coastline, finally dissipating on 16 March.

Ex-Tropical Cyclone Linda passed within about 300 km (190 mi) of Fraser Island at its closest approach to Australia, and produced large waves and swell which were experienced on exposed southern Queensland beaches. Due to the dangerous surf conditions, many beaches south of Fraser Island were closed on 14 and 15 March for the safety of the public. Areas off parts of the Sunshine Coast experienced waves of up to 8 metres (26 feet), and 1 metre (3.3 feet) of beach erosion occurred at the Gold Coast. Sustained gale-force winds were recorded on the Australian mainland at Double Island Point on 14 March, with gusts up to 85 km/h (55 mph).

=== Severe Tropical Cyclone Marcus ===
- Category 5 severe tropical cyclone (Australian scale)
- Category 5 tropical cyclone (SSHWS)
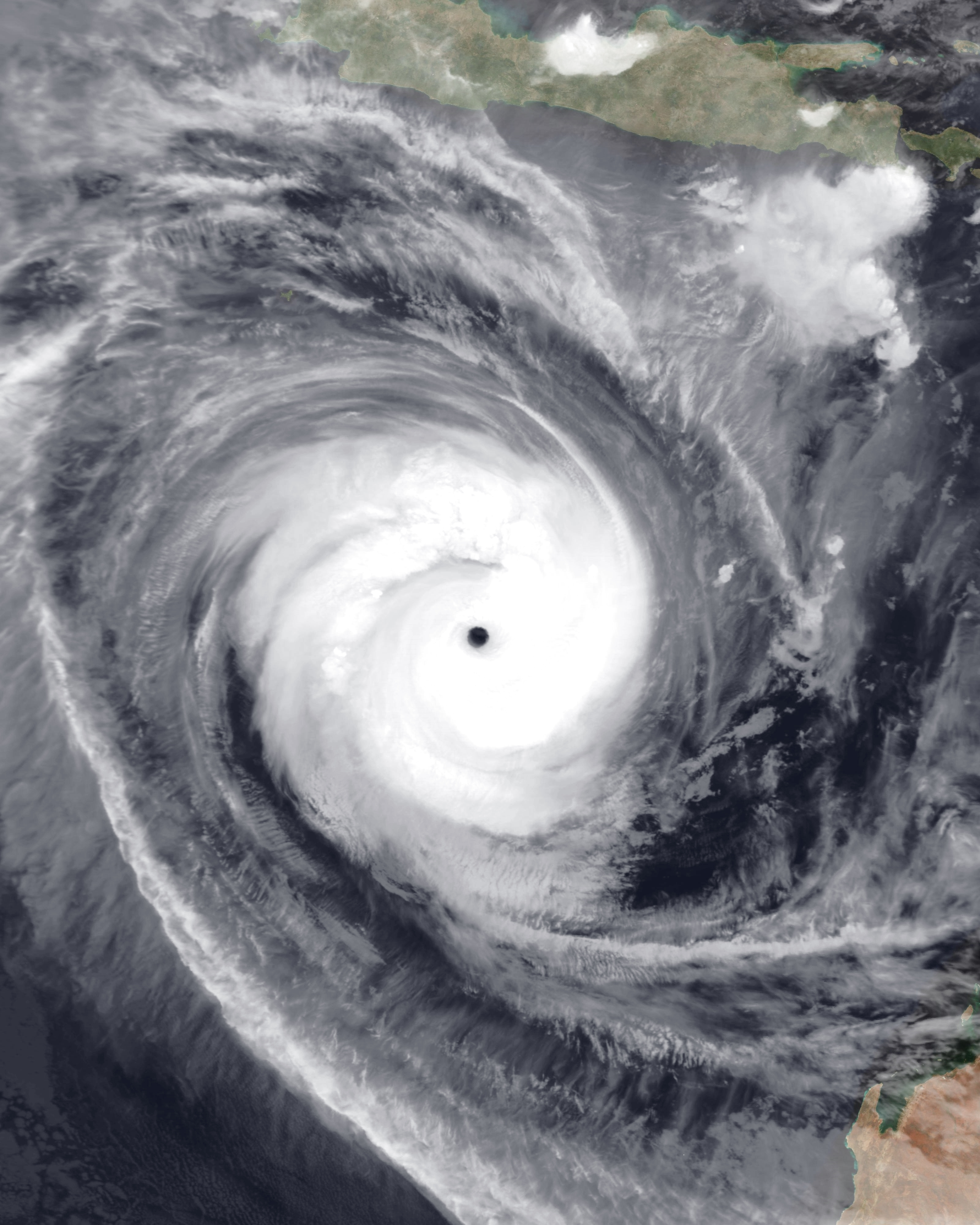
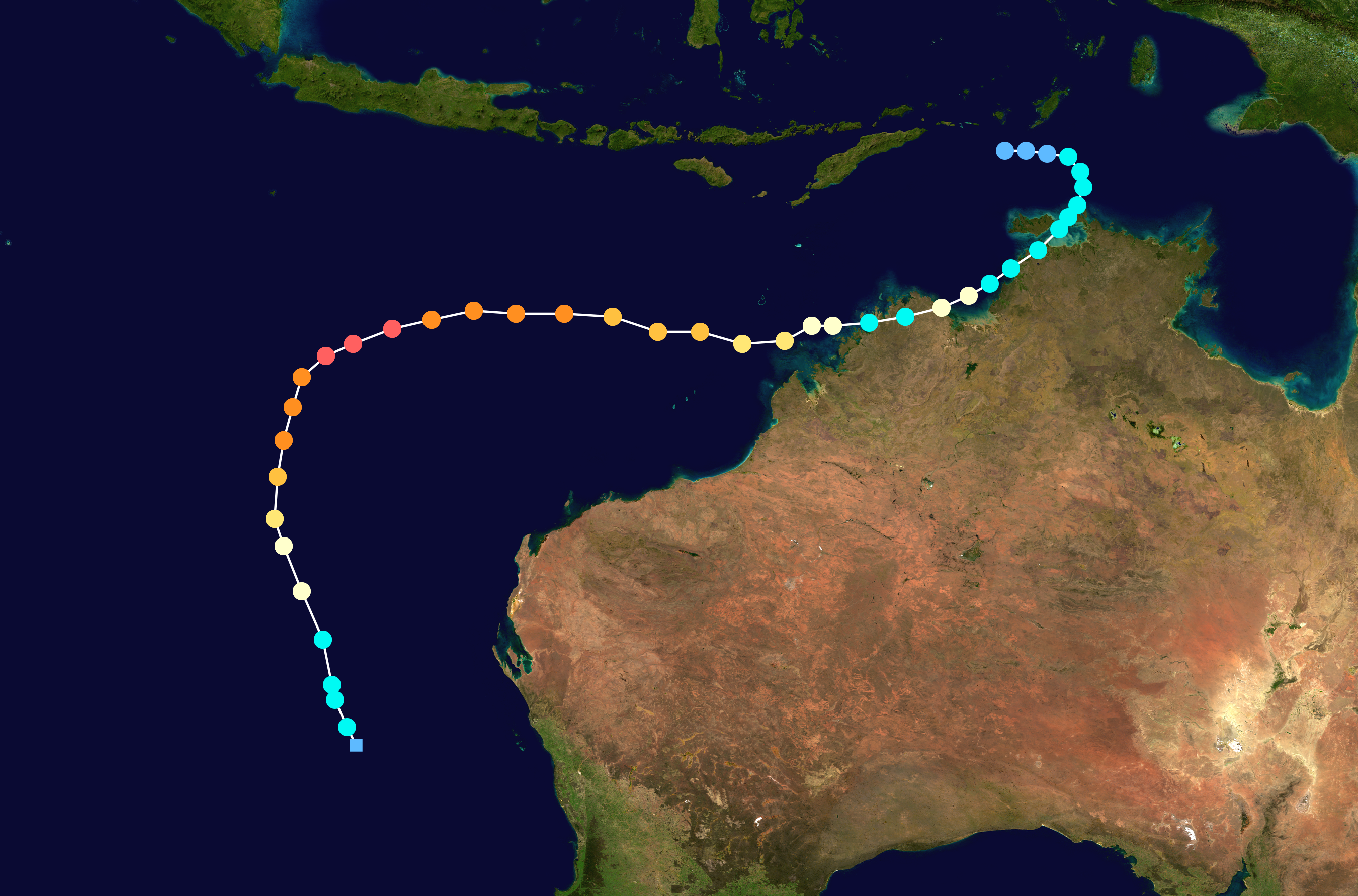
- Duration: 14 March – 24 March
- Peak intensity: 250 km/h (155 mph) (10-min); 905 hPa (mbar)

On 14 March, the Australian Bureau of Meteorology issued cyclone warnings for Darwin, the Tiwi Islands and parts of the northwest Top End.

Marcus formed north of the Tiwi Islands as a Category 1 tropical cyclone on the Australian scale, and was upgraded to Category 2 in the hours before it hit the Northern Territory coastline on 17 March. Major events and flights in and out of Darwin were cancelled. Upon moving away from the coast, Marcus intensified markedly, and on 21 March, Cyclone Marcus reached Category 5 status on both cyclone scales. From then on, Marcus began a weakening phase, brushing by Western Australia and weakening below tropical cyclone intensity on 24 March.

=== Severe Tropical Cyclone Nora ===
- Category 3 severe tropical cyclone (Australian scale)
- Category 3 tropical cyclone (SSHWS)
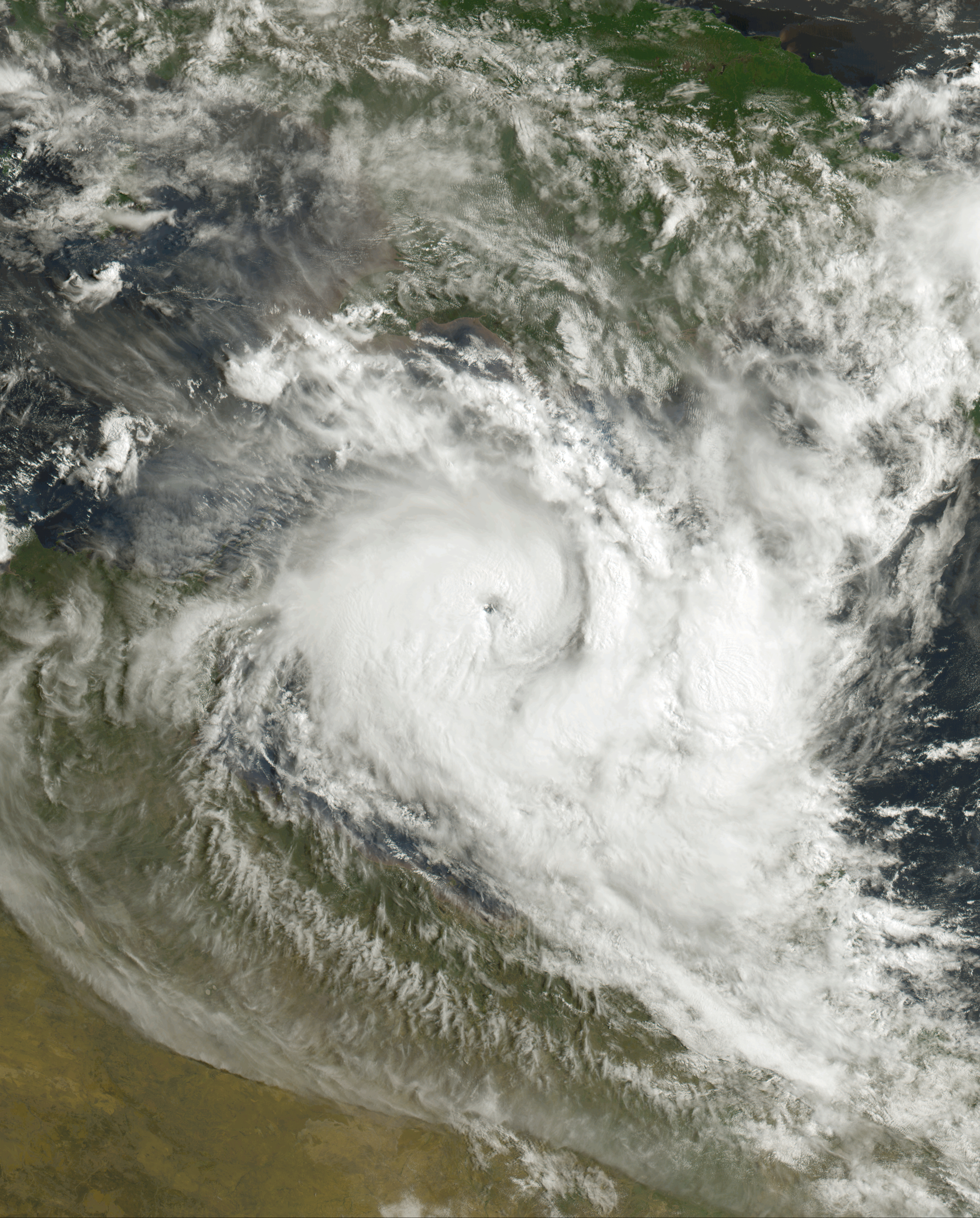
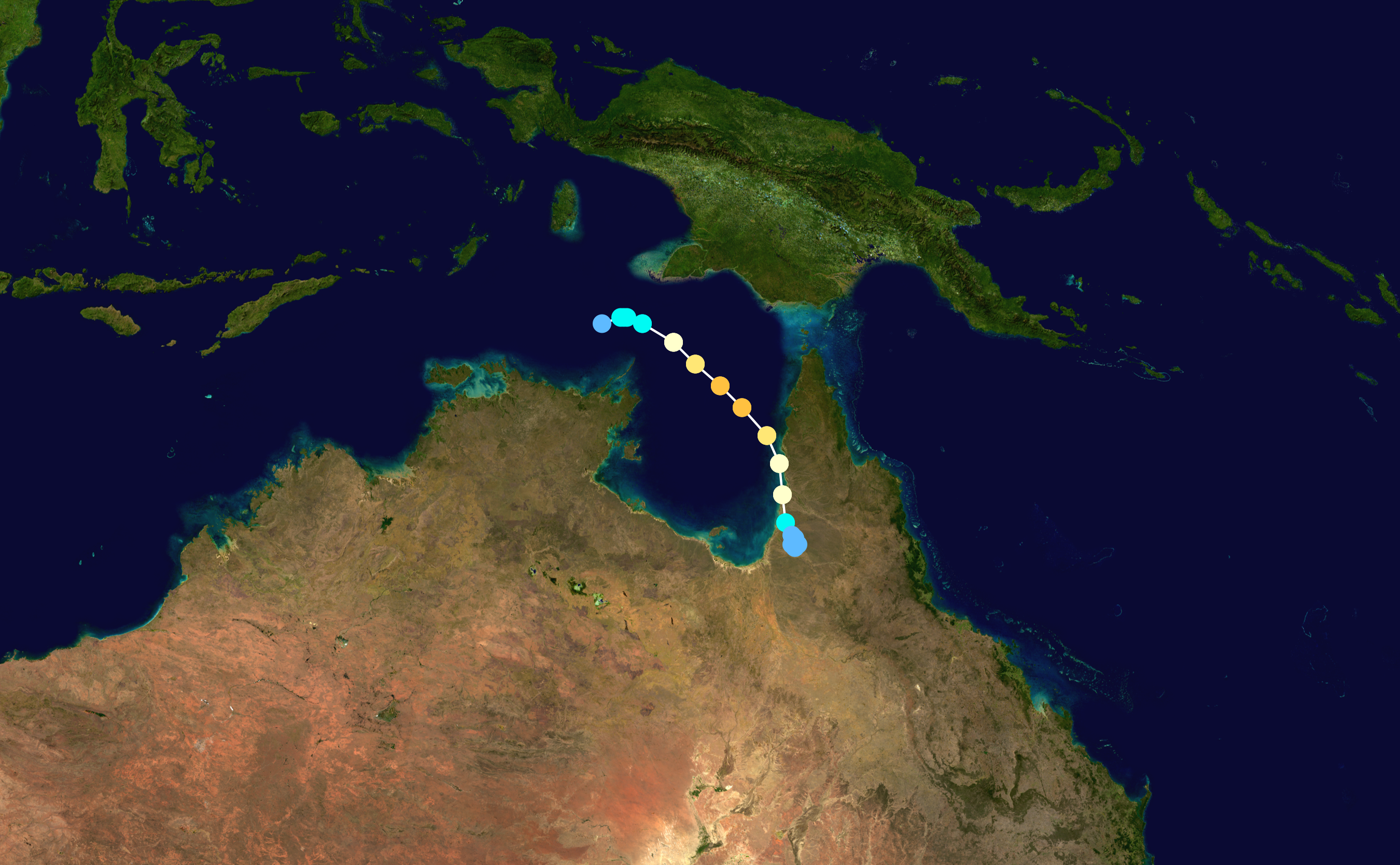
- Duration: 19 March – 26 March
- Peak intensity: 155 km/h (100 mph) (10-min); 958 hPa (mbar)

On the afternoon of 19 March, the Bureau of Meteorology reported on the development of a weak tropical low in the Torres Strait, north of Thursday Island. Two days later, on the afternoon of 21 March, tropical cyclone advice bulletins were initiated as the tropical low began to develop, and a cyclone watch was issued for the far northeastern coastal region of the Top End. At this stage, the system was forecast to coalesce into a tropical cyclone by 4:00 a.m. on 23 March (ACST), and then reach severe tropical cyclone strength by 4:00 p.m. the next day. On the afternoon of 22 March, the Joint Typhoon Warning Center upgraded the strengthening system to a tropical storm. Later on the same day, the Bureau of Meteorology identified that sustained gale-force winds had developed on the northern semicircle of the system; however, the system was still classified as a tropical low as these winds did not extend more than halfway around the circulation centre. On 23 March, the system organized sufficiently into a tropical cyclone, and was named Nora by the BoM. Within the next couple of days, Nora intensified into a Category 3 Severe Tropical Cyclone, before making landfall on the Top End at that intensity. Afterward, Nora gradually began to weaken, degenerating into a tropical low soon afterward. On 26 March, Nora's remnant low stalled, and began to slowly meander counterclockwise over the Top End. On 27 March, Nora's remnant moved westward across the Gulf of Carpentaria. On the next day, Nora's remnant made landfall on the Australian coast once again and dissipated.

=== Tropical Cyclone Iris ===
- Category 2 tropical cyclone (Australian scale)
- Tropical storm (SSHWS)
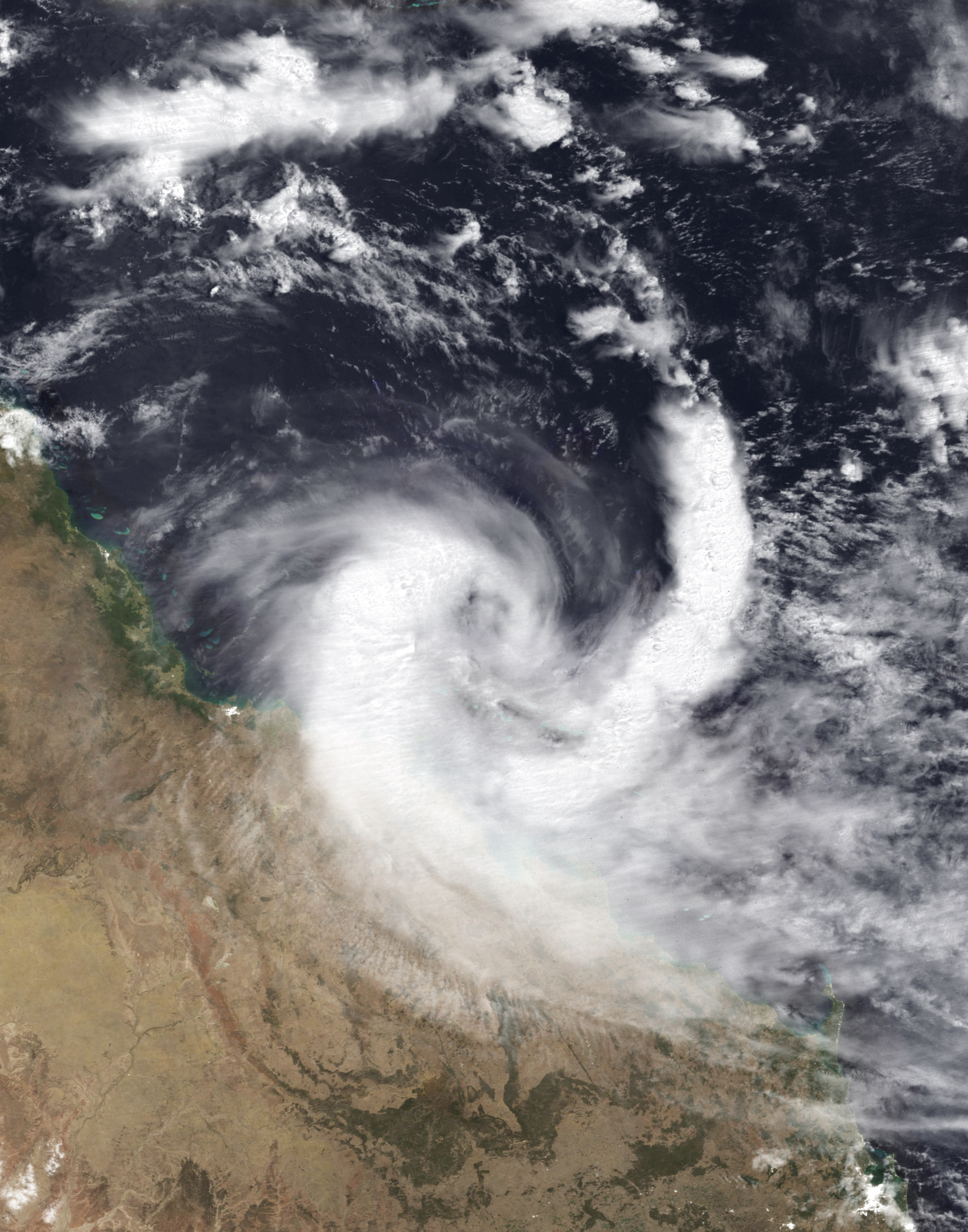
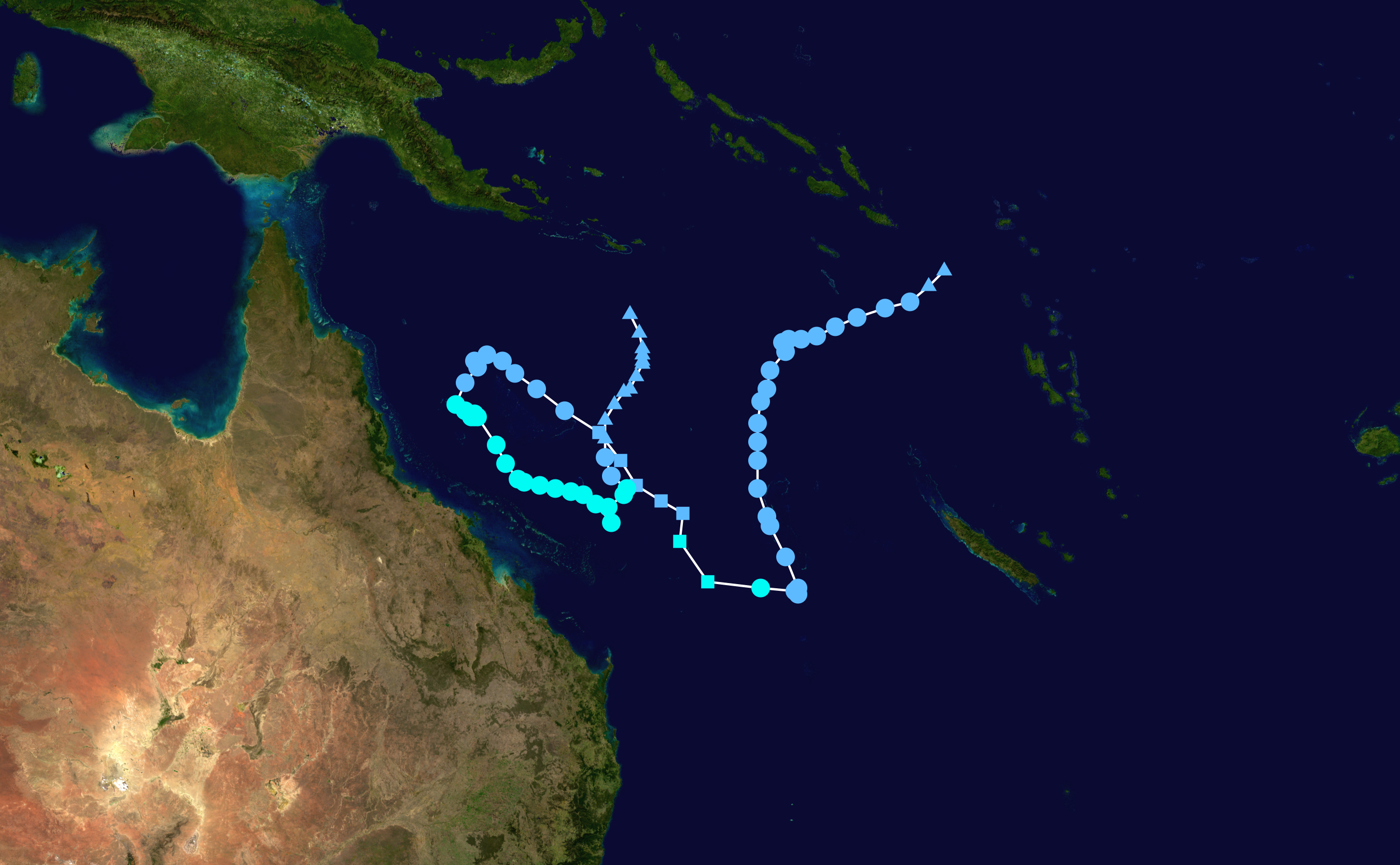
- Duration: 24 March (Entered basin) – 9 April
- Peak intensity: 100 km/h (65 mph) (10-min); 982 hPa (mbar)

During 24 March, the BoM reported that Cyclone Iris had moved into the Australian region from the South Pacific as a Category 1 tropical cyclone, while located about 520 km (325 mi) to the south of Honiara in the Solomon Islands. According to the BoM, the system quickly weakened into a tropical low during that day as it moved further into the Australian region. Conversely, the JTWC reported that Iris had developed into a tropical cyclone at around 04:00 AEST on 25 March (18:00 UTC on 24 March), when there were good divergence aloft and a formative poleward outflow channel, although high vertical wind shear kept impacting the system. Tracking generally southwards along the western periphery of a near-equatoral ridge, Iris remained weak with an exposed low-level circulation centre, which resulted in the final warning from the JTWC being issued at 09:00 UTC on 27 March, as colder sea surface temperatures further eroded the fully sheared system. On 28 March, Iris slowed down and started to exhibit subtropical characteristics. The subtropical low began to drift northwestward, parallel to the coast of Queensland on 29 March. The JTWC issued a Tropical Cyclone Formation Alert for Iris again on 1 April, due to the increasing amounts of persistent convection and improving low-level banding. These factors indicated that Iris had transitioned back to a tropical low on the same day, as it turned towards the south-southeast.

Both the BoM and the JTWC reported that Iris had redeveloped into a tropical cyclone at around 10:00 AEST (00:00 UTC) on 2 April, supported by Dvorak technique estimates as well as sustained gales recorded by the automatic weather station at Flinders Reef. A half-day later, the station further recorded maximum sustained winds at 58 knots (107 km/h; 67 mph). Thanks to weak vertical wind shear, warm SSTs at 28 °C, and excellent poleward outflow, the BoM indicated that Iris had further intensified into a Category 2 tropical cyclone at around 04:00 AEST on 3 April (18:00 UTC on 2 April), with estimated 10-minute maximum sustained winds at 100 km/h (60 mph). Iris became almost stationary on the same day, due to the competing steering influences from a near-equatorial ridge located to the northeast and a subtropical ridge anchored over Australia. Early on 3 April, Iris resumed its south-southeastward track and turned eastward; at the same time, the low-level circulation centre became partially exposed, with deep convection only persisting over the southern periphery of the storm, showing that the intensification had stopped.

At 04:07 AEST on 4 April (18:07 UTC on 3 April), microwave imagery revealed that Iris briefly had formed a shallow eyewall, prompting the JTWC to indicate that Iris reached its peak intensity at 10:00 AEST (00:00 UTC), with the same estimate as the BoM's 30 hours earlier. However, the BoM downgraded Iris to a Category 1 tropical cyclone at 16:00 AEST (06:00 UTC), as the unfavourable environment with moderate northwesterly wind shear, weak upper-level outflow, penetrating dry air, and marginal supportive SSTs at about 26 °C, had begun to impact the sheared system.

=== Tropical Cyclone Flamboyan ===
- Category 1 tropical cyclone (Australian scale)
- Tropical storm (SSHWS)
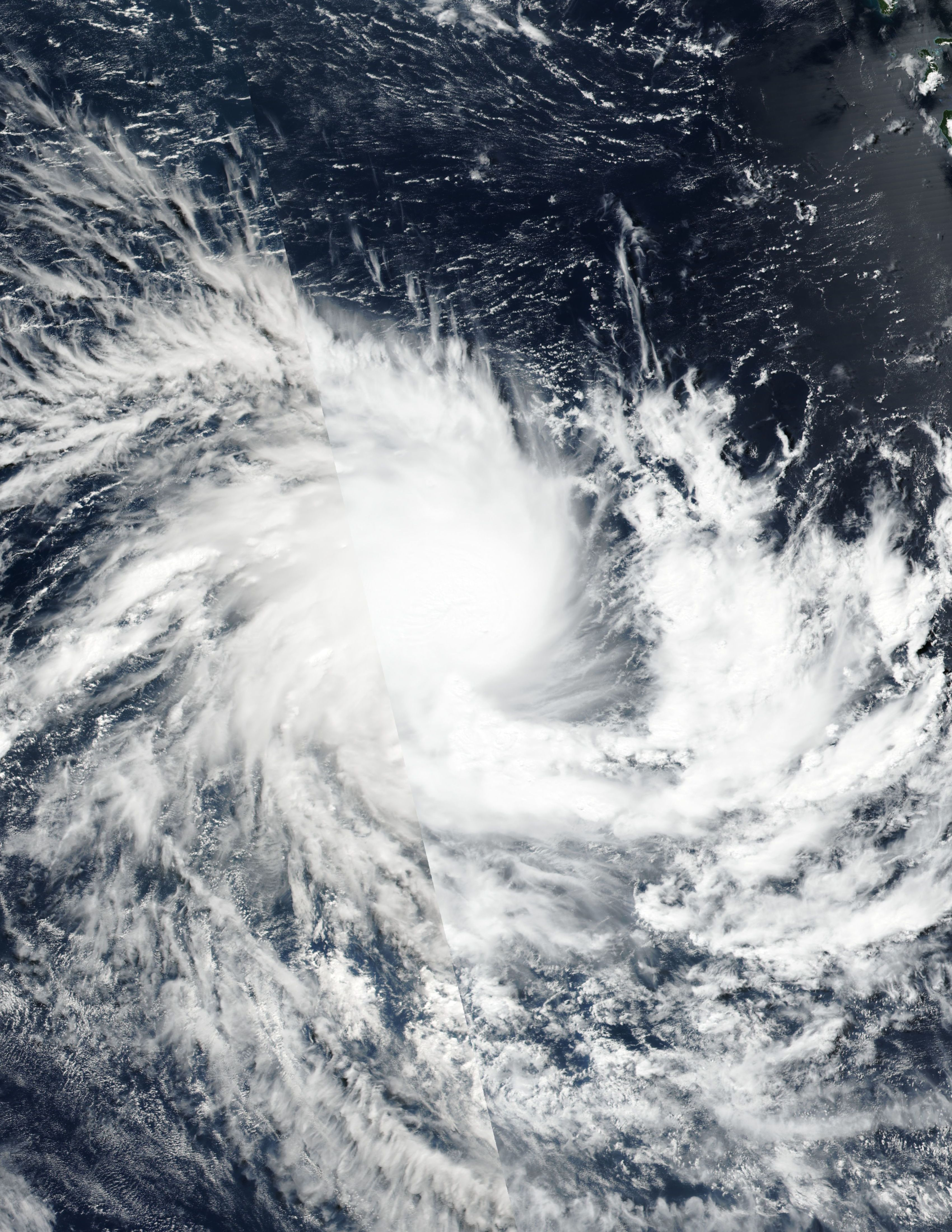
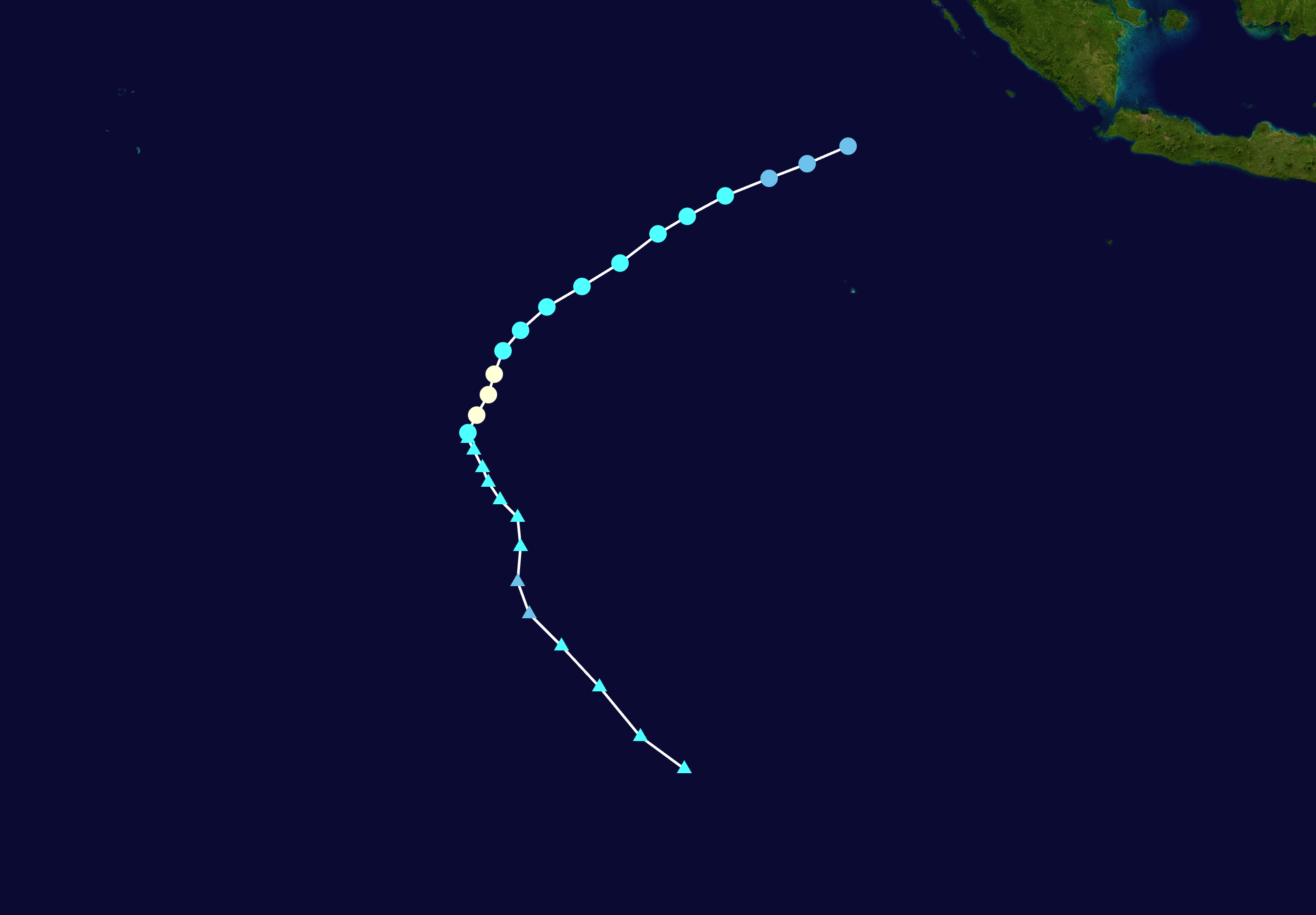
- Duration: 27 April – 28 April (Exited basin)
- Peak intensity: 65 km/h (40 mph) (10-min); 1002 hPa (mbar)

Flamboyan formed on 27 April, before moving into the South-West Indian Ocean basin on 28 April. Afterward, the system began intensifying. Flamboyan occurred outside the Australian region, having developed north of 10S in Indonesia's area of responsibility before moving southwest into La Réunion's area of responsibility.

=== Other systems ===
On 1 December, a tropical low formed to the south of Java. The tropical low rapidly moved southwestward, before dissipating the next day.

On 1 January, TCWC Perth began to track a small, weak tropical low to the south of Bali. The system was last mentioned the next day.

On 14 January, a weak tropical low had developed about 750 km (470 mi) to the northwest of Exmouth. The tropical low moved in a general westward direction for several days until it was last monitored by TCWC Perth on 19 January.

On 27 January, TCWC Brisbane began monitoring on a tropical low-pressure system that was located to the south of the Solomon Islands. The system had a moderate chance of becoming a tropical cyclone although the system had already crossed basins into the South Pacific where it subsequently became Tropical Cyclone Fehi by 29 January.

On 1 February, a weak tropical low had briefly developed in the Coral Sea.

On 9 February, a slow-moving tropical low had developed located about 450 km (280 mi) to the northwest of Cooktown, Queensland. The system moved westward and was last noticed three days later.

On 4 March, a tropical low persisted to the west of Queensland. In the course of two days, the tropical low emerged towards the waters of the Gulf of Carpentaria. The tropical low rapidly dissipated, however, on 9 March.

A weak tropical low near the Solomon Islands was first identified by the Bureau of Meteorology on 17 March. Over the next couple of days, the tropical low meandered over the Solomon Sea. The system was last noted by the Bureau of Meteorology on the afternoon of 19 March.

== Storm names ==
=== Bureau of Meteorology ===
Since the start of the 2008–09 season, there has only been one list from which the Bureau of Meteorology has assigned names to tropical cyclones, despite still operating three separate tropical cyclone warning centres (TCWCs) in Perth, Darwin and Brisbane. These warning centres monitor all tropical cyclones that form within the Australian region, including any within the areas of responsibility of TCWC Jakarta or TCWC Port Moresby. A total of seven tropical cyclones were named by the BOM during the season; these are listed below.

- Hilda
- Irving
- Joyce
- Kelvin
- Linda
- Marcus
- Nora

=== TCWC Jakarta ===
The TCWC in Jakarta, operated by the Indonesian Agency for Meteorology, Climatology and Geophysics, monitors tropical cyclones from the Equator to 11°S and between the longitudes 90°E and 145°E. Tropical depressions which reached tropical cyclone strength within this region were named by TCWC Jakarta. This occurred a record total of three times this season, and the names used are listed below.

- Cempaka
- Dahlia
- Flamboyan

=== TCWC Port Moresby ===
Tropical cyclones that develop between the Equator and 11°S, between 151°E and 160°E, are assigned names by the TCWC in Port Moresby, Papua New Guinea. Tropical cyclone formation in this area is rare, with no cyclones being named in it since 2007. A chronological list is not used; rather, names are selected in a random order from a pool of names.

=== Name retirement ===
Due to the damage that Cyclone Marcus caused in Darwin, along with its subsequent intensification into a powerful Category 5 severe tropical cyclone, the BOM retired the name Marcus from its naming list. It was replaced by Marco.

== Season effects ==
Name	Dates	Peak intensity			Areas affected	Damage (USD)	Deaths	Ref(s).
Name	Dates	Category	Wind speed	Pressure	Areas affected	Damage (USD)	Deaths	Ref(s).
01U	8 August	Tropical low	35 km/h (20 mph)	1005 hPa (29.68 inHg)	None	None	None	
Cempaka	21 – 29 November	Category 2 tropical cyclone	110 km/h (70 mph)	990 hPa (29.23 inHg)	Indonesia	$83.6 million	41	
04U	26 – 29 November	Tropical low	Not specified	1005 hPa (29.68 inHg)	Indonesia	None	None	
Dahlia	25 November – 4 December	Category 2 tropical cyclone	100 km/h (65 mph)	980 hPa (28.94 inHg)	Indonesia, Christmas Island	Unknown	Unknown	
05U	1–2 December	Tropical low	Not specified	Not specified	None	None	None	
Hilda	26–29 December	Category 2 tropical cyclone	100 km/h (60 mph)	980 hPa (28.94 inHg)	Western Australia	Minor	None	
07U	1–2 January	Tropical low	Not specified	1006 hPa (29.71 inHg)	None	None	None	
Irving	3–6 January	Category 1 tropical cyclone	75 km/h (45 mph)	993 hPa (29.32 inHg)	None	None	None	
Joyce	6–13 January	Category 2 tropical cyclone	95 km/h (60 mph)	975 hPa (28.79 inHg)	Western Australia	None	None	
10U	14–19 January	Tropical low	Not specified	Not specified	None	None	None	
11U	20 January – 1 February	Tropical low	75 km/h (45 mph)	985 hPa (29.09 inHg)	Top End, Western Australia	None	None	
12U	23–24 January	Tropical low	Not specified	Not specified	None	None	None	
Fehi	26–28 January	Tropical low	55 km/h (35 mph)	993 hPa (29.32 inHg)	Solomon Islands	None	None	
14U	1 February	Tropical low	Not specified	Not specified	None	None	None	
15U	9–12 February	Tropical low	Not specified	Not specified	None	None	None	
Kelvin	11–21 February	Category 3 severe tropical cyclone	150 km/h (95 mph)	955 hPa (28.20 inHg)	Top End, Western Australia, South Australia	$25 million	None	
18U	4–9 March	Tropical low	Not specified	1001 hPa (29.56 inHg)	Northern Territory	$40 million	None	
Linda	11 – 16 March	Category 1 tropical cyclone	75 km/h (45 mph)	993 hPa (29.32 inHg)	Solomon Islands, New Caledonia; Southern Queensland	None	None	
Marcus	14–24 March	Category 5 severe tropical cyclone	250 km/h (155 mph)	905 hPa (26.72 inHg)	Tanimbar Islands, East Timor, Top End, Kimberley	$75 million	None	
Nora	19–26 March	Category 3 severe tropical cyclone	155 km/h (95 mph)	958 hPa (28.29 inHg)	New Guinea, Aru Islands, Northern Territory, Queensland	$25 million	None	
23U	23–25 March	Tropical low	Not specified	1004 hPa (29.65 inHg)	None	None	None	
Iris	24 March – 9 April	Category 2 tropical cyclone	100 km/h (65 mph)	982 hPa (29.00 inHg)	Solomon Islands, Queensland	Minimal	None	
Flamboyan	27–28 April	Category 1 tropical cyclone	65 km/h (40 mph)	1002 hPa (29.59 inHg)	None	None	None	
Season aggregates
23 systems	8 August – 28 April		230 km/h (145 mph)	905 hPa (26.72 inHg)		$249 million	41	

== See also ==
- Weather of 2017 and 2018
- Australian region tropical cyclone
- Tropical cyclones in 2017 and 2018
- List of Southern Hemisphere tropical cyclone seasons
- Atlantic hurricane seasons: 2017, 2018
- Pacific hurricane seasons: 2017, 2018
- Pacific typhoon seasons: 2017, 2018
- North Indian Ocean cyclone seasons: 2017, 2018
- 2017–18 South-West Indian Ocean cyclone season
- 2017–18 South Pacific cyclone season
