= Hola =

Hola (Spanish for "hello" or "hi") or HOLA may refer to:

== Places ==
- Hola, Kenya, a capital of the Tana River county
- Hola, Gmina Biała Podlaska, village in Poland
- Hola, Włodawa County, village in Poland

== Art and entertainment ==
- Hola/Chau, a double-live album by Los Fabulosos Cadillacs
- ¡Hola!, a weekly Spanish-language magazine
- Hola (card game), a Polish and Ukrainian trick-taking game related to Sedma
- "Hola", a song by Miranda! from El Disco de Tu Corazón
- "Hola!", a song by Panda from La Revancha Del Príncipe Charro

== Other uses ==
- Hola (VPN), a web and mobile application
- holA, a bacterial gene
- Hola Airlines, a former Spanish airline based in Palma de Mallorca, Majorca
- Cyclone Hola, a strong tropical cyclone of the Pacific
- Hola Mohalla, a Sikh festival
- Hispanic Organization of Latin Actors, a not-for-profit, arts service and advocacy organization

== Surname ==
- Holá, feminine form of the Czech surname Holý
- Jindra Holá (born 1960), Czech ice dancer
- Peter Hola (born 1999), Australian-New Zealand rugby league footballer
- Pierre Hola (born 1978), Tongan rugby union footballer

== See also ==
- Holla (disambiguation)
- Hola Hola (disambiguation)
