= Holler =

Holler may refer to:

== Arts, entertainment, and media ==
- Field holler, a song form
- Goofy holler, a stock sound effect that is used frequently in Disney cartoons and films
- Holler (album), a 2018 EP by Amy Ray
- Holler (EP), a 2014 EP by Girls' Generation-TTS, or its title track
- Holler (film), a 2020 American drama film
- "Holler" (Ginuwine song), 1997
- "Holler" (Spice Girls song), 2000
- Holler, a band fronted by Terence Holler

== Places ==
- Holler, Germany, a municipality in Rhineland-Palatinate
- Holler, Luxembourg, a village in Weiswampach

== People ==
- Höller, a German surname
- Holler (surname)

== Other ==
- A narrow valley between mountain ridges in Appalachia, a hollow.

== See also ==
- Holder (surname)
- Holla (disambiguation)
- Hollar (disambiguation)
