= If It All Goes South =

Studio album by Amy Ray
- Released: September 16, 2022
- Genre: Country rock
- Length: 39:10
- Language: English
- Label: Daemon

Amy Ray chronology
Holler (2018)	If It All Goes South (2022)

If It All Goes South is a studio album by American folk rock singer-songwriter Amy Ray, released on Daemon Records in 2022 and has received positive reviews from critics.

== Recording and release ==
If It All Goes South is part of a series of albums that Ray has released that explore Americana and country music. This album also includes the explicit references to politics and activism that have marked her career as a musician, and at the point of recording, Ray was looking for healing in the United States and the American South in particular. Ray was also inspired by social justice movements occurring during the recording period.

To record the music, Ray worked with many of the same musicians that she used on her 2014 release Goodnight Tender and 2018's Holler, traveling to many studios across America to collaborate and recording live to tape. Unlike those two releases, she also previewed this album by releasing several tracks as lead singles; this was useful for band cohesion during the COVID-19 pandemic.

== Reception ==
Editors at AllMusic Guide scored this album four out of five stars, with reviewer Timothy Monger noting that Ray continues to explore a variety of American roots music traditions "without letting them define her" and pointing out several tracks with differing emotions, genres, and collaborators that create a solid musical statement as an album. In No Depression, Andy Crump characterizes this album as one where "every track matters; every note has meaning", and he notes the masterful way that Ray mixes her musicianship and activism. Editors at AllMusic included this on their list of favorite folk and Americana albums of 2023.

== Track listing ==
All songs written by Amy Ray, except where noted

1. "Joy Train" – 3:54
2. "Chuck Will’s Widow" – 3:41
3. "They Won’t Have Me" – 4:45
4. "From This Room" – 3:23
5. "Tear It Down" – 3:46
6. "A Mighty Thing" – 3:16
7. "Subway" – 4:20
8. "Cowboys and Pirates" – 3:37
9. "Muscadine" – 5:14
10. "North Star" (Phil Cook and Amy Ray) – 3:12

== Personnel ==
=== Musicians ===
- Amy Ray – vocals; acoustic guitar on "A Mighty Thing", "Subway", "Cowboys and Pirates", and "Muscadine"; electric guitar on "Joy Train", "They Won’t Have Me", "From This Room", and "North Star"
- Jim Brock – drums on "Joy Train", "They Won’t Have Me", "From This Room", "A Mighty Thing", "Subway", "Cowboys and Pirates", "Muscadine", and "North Star"; percussion on "They Won’t Have Me", "From This Room", "Muscadine", and "North Star"; congas "Chuck Will’s Widow"
- Kerry Brooks – bass on "Subway"; bass guitar on "Joy Train" and "North Star"; electric upright bass on "Chuck Will’s Widow", "They Won’t Have Me", "From This Room", "Tear It Down", "A Mighty Thing", "Cowboys and Pirates", and "Muscadine"
- Alison Brown – banjo on "Joy Train", "They Won’t Have Me", "A Mighty Thing", and "Cowboys and Pirates"; banjola on "They Won’t Have Me"
- Adrian Carter – fiddle on "Joy Train", "A Mighty Thing", "Cowboys and Pirates", and "North Star"; acoustic guitar on "From This Room"; electric guitar on "They Won’t Have Me"; violin on "They Won’t Have Me", "Tear It Down", "Subway", and "Muscadine"; backing vocals on "Joy Train"; string arrangement on "Tear It Down"
- Elanore Denig – violin on "Subway"
- Gabe Dixon – piano on "Subway", string arrangement on "Subway"
- Eric Eagle – drums on "Tear It Down"; recording on "Tear It Down"
- Jeff Fielder – backing vocals; electric guitar on "Joy Train", "They Won’t Have Me", "From This Room", "Tear It Down", "A Mighty Thing", "Subway", "Cowboys and Pirates", and "North Star"; dobro on "Chuck Will’s Widow", "They Won’t Have Me", and "Muscadine"; slide guitar on "From This Room" and "Subway"; acoustic guitar on "They Won’t Have Me"; baritone guitar on "A Mighty Thing"; celesta on "From This Room"; clavinet on "Chuck Will’s Widow"; drums on "Chuck Will’s Widow"; mandolin on "Chuck Will’s Widow"; percussion on "Chuck Will's Widow"; rhythm guitar on "Subway"; upright piano on "Muscadine"; vocals on "A Mighty Thing"
- Cara Fox – cello on "Subway"
- Greg Griffith – dobro on "Cowboys and Pirates"
- Jordan Hamlin – trumpet on "Cowboys and Pirates"
- Sarah Jarosz – mandolin on "Chuck Will's Widow" and "A Mighty Thing", vocals on "Chuck Will’s Widow" and "A Mighty Thing"
- Ray Mason – trombone on "Cowboys and Pirates"
- Aoife O'Donovan – acoustic guitar on "Chuck Will’s Widow", vocals on "Chuck Will’s Widow"
- Matt Smith – pedal steel guitar on "From This Room", "Tear It Down", "Subway", "Cowboys and Pirates", "Muscadine", and "North Star"; dobro on "Joy Train"
- Daniel Walker – organ on "Joy Train", "They Won’t Have Me", "A Mighty Thing", and "North Star"; piano on "Joy Train" and "From This Room"; accordion on "Chuck Will’s Widow"; backing vocals on "Joy Train"; grand piano on "Subway"; Mellotron on "From This Room"; upright piano on "Cowboys and Pirates"
- Sara Watkins – fiddle and vocals on "Chuck Will’s Widow"
- Claire Whitcomb – viola on "Subway"
- Julie Wolf – grand piano on "Tear It Down"

=== Vocalists ===
- Courtney Campbell – vocals on "North Star"
- Natalie Hemby – vocals on "Tear It Down"
- Ashley (Charisse) Mackey – vocals on "North Star"
- H. C. McEntire – vocals on "Muscadine"
- Michelle Prather – vocals on "North Star"
- Allison Russell – vocals on "Tear It Down"
- Brian Speiser – backing vocals on "Tear It Down"
- Madalyn Stefanak – backing vocals on "Tear It Down", May Bragg "Joy Train", "They Won’t Have Me", and "Cowboys and Pirates"
- Becky Warren – backing vocals on "Joy Train", "They Won’t Have Me", and "Cowboys and Pirates"
- Hannah West – backing vocals on "Joy Train", "They Won’t Have Me", and "Cowboys and Pirates"

=== Production and other ===
- Amy Ray – additional mixing; additional production; photography
- Adam Ayan – mastering at Gateway Mastering
- Kevin Boggs – recording on "Tear It Down"
- Jim Brock – recording on "Muscadine"
- Kerry Brooks – recording on "Tear It Down" and "Muscadine"
- Adrian Carter – recording on "Tear It Down" and "Muscadine"
- Skyler Chuckry – assistant engineering
- Phil Cook – additional production, photography
- Rick Cooper – recording on "Muscadine"
- Jeff Fielder – additional mixing; supplemental recording; additional production
- Mary Manthei – photography
- H. C. McEntire – recording on "Muscadine"
- Nino Moschella – recording assistance on "Tear It Down"
- Gary Paczosa – recording
- Larry Ray, Sr. – photography
- Darren Schneider – recording
- Brian Speiser – production, additional mixing, recording on "Muscadine"
- David Spreng – recording on "Tear It Down"
- Lisa Sullivan – photography
- Bobby Tis – recording, mixing
- Julie Wolf – engineering on "Tear It Down"
- Nathan Yaccino – recording

Recording locations:

- Bird and Egg Studio
- Full Sail University
- Minutia Studios
- Nightbird Studios
- Northern Lights, Maple Valley
- Skoor Sound
- Sound Emporium Studios
- Swamp Raga Studios (mixing)
- Waterfielder Studios, Seattle WA

== See also ==
- 2022 in American music
- Lists of 2022 albums
