= 2017–18 Southern Hemisphere tropical cyclone season =

The 2017–18 Southern Hemisphere tropical cyclone season may refer to:

- 2017–18 South-West Indian Ocean cyclone season, west of 90°E
- 2017–18 Australian region cyclone season, between 90°E and 160°E
- 2017–18 South Pacific cyclone season, east of 160°E
- Subtropical Storm Guará
- Subtropical Cyclone Lexi
