= Höller =

Höller is a German surname. Notable people with the surname include:

- Carsten Höller (born 1961), German artist
- Karl Höller (1907–1987), German composer
- Stephan A. Hoeller (born 1931), Hungarian writer, scholar and religious leader
- Thomas Höller (born 1976), Austrian footballer
- York Höller (born 1944), German composer

== See also ==
- Heller (disambiguation)
- Holler (disambiguation)
