= Holla =

Holla may refer to:

== People ==
- Aarti Holla-Maini, British lawyer
- Danny Holla (born 1987), Dutch footballer
- Raksha Holla (born 1991), Indian actress

== Places ==
- Holla Municipality, a former municipality in Telemark county, Norway
- Holla, Trøndelag, a village in Heim Municipality in Trøndelag county, Norway

== Music ==
- "Holla", a song by EXID
- "Holla", a 2001 song from Genesis (Busta Rhymes album)
- "Holla", a melody by Ghostface Killah from his album The Pretty Toney Album
- "Holla", a song by Proyecto Uno 2003
- "Holla", a song by MAX from Hell's Kitchen Angel, 2016
- Holla!, a 2004 album by Baha Men, or the title track

== Other ==
- Holla, a surname of the Kota Brahmins of Karnataka state of India
- Holla, a typeface created by Rudolf Koch

== See also ==
- Hola (disambiguation)
- Holler (disambiguation)
