= Hollar =

Hollar (or Hollars) may refer to:

People

- B. J. Hollars (born 1984), American literary essayist and nonfiction novelist
- Bill Hollar (1938–2012), American race car driver
- John Hollar (1922–1997), American football fullback
- Steve Hollar (born 1966), American actor and dentist
- Wenceslaus Hollar (1607–1677), Bohemian graphic artist

Others

- Hollar!, an album by Etta Jones
- Hollar Hosiery Mills-Knit Sox Knitting Mills, a historic knitting mill in North Carolina, U.S.A.
- The Hollars, a 2016 American comedy-drama film
- "The Savage Hollar", a nickname of Victoria, Newfoundland and Labrador, an incorporated town in Canada
- 46280 Hollar, a main-belt asteroid named for Wenceslaus Hollar
- A lower area between higher elevations, a hollow.

== See also ==
- Holler (disambiguation)
