= Becky Warren =

American singer-songwriter

Becky Warren is a singer-songwriter and guitarist based in Nashville, Tennessee. She has won both the MerleFest Songwriting Contest and the Kerrville New Folk Competition. She formerly performed with the Boston-based alternative country band The Great Unknowns as their frontwoman, beginning in 2003. In 2016, she released her solo debut album, War Surplus, a concept album that follows a fictional couple, Scott, and his girlfriend-turned-wife, June. Warren performs all of the album's songs from either Scott's or June's perspective. The album is based on Warren's own life, as she married a soldier in 2005 who was deployed to fight in the Iraq War soon afterward. When he returned, he had developed posttraumatic stress disorder. Four years after they married, Warren and her husband divorced. Warren spent four year writing the songs on War Surplus.

== Discography ==
- War Surplus (2016)
- Undesirable (2018)
- The Sick Season (2020)
