= Hola Hola =

Hola Hola may refer to:

- Hola Hola (EP), a 2017 EP by Kard
  - "Hola Hola" (Kard song), the title song
- Hola Hola, an EP by the Rosso Sisters, 2014
- Hola Hola (Sugarboy song), 2016
- "Holá Holá", a song by Hot Banditoz, 2005
