= Holler (surname) =

Holler is a surname. Notable people with the surname include:

- Kjell Holler (1925–2000), Norwegian politician
- Liesel Holler (born 1980), Peruvian doctor, model, and beauty pageant titleholder
- Monica Holler (born 1984), Swedish professional cyclist
- Terence Holler (born 1968), Italian-American singer
