= Holý =

Holý (feminine: Holá) is a Czech surname, literally meaning 'bald'. It could either refer to the bearer's bald or beardless appearance, but figuratively this word also meant 'poor' and could therefore refer to the social status of the bearer. Notable persons with the surname include:

- Antonín Holý (1936–2012), Czech scientist and chemist
- David Holý (born 1998), Czech pole vaulter
- Jindra Holá (born 1960), Czech ice dancer
- Jiří Holý (1922–2009), Czech actor
- Karel Holý (born 1956), Czech ice hockey player
- Ladislav Holý (1933–1997), Czech anthropologist and Africanist
- Mirela Holy (born 1971), Croatian politician
- Stanislav Holý (1943–1998), Czech graphic artist
- Štefan Holý (born 1978), Slovak politician
- Tomáš Holý (born 1991), Czech footballer

== See also ==
- Prokop the Great, known in Czech as Prokop Holý (c. 1380 – 1434), Czech Hussite general
