= Cyclone Hola =

Category 4 severe tropical cyclone in 2017

Severe Tropical Cyclone Hola
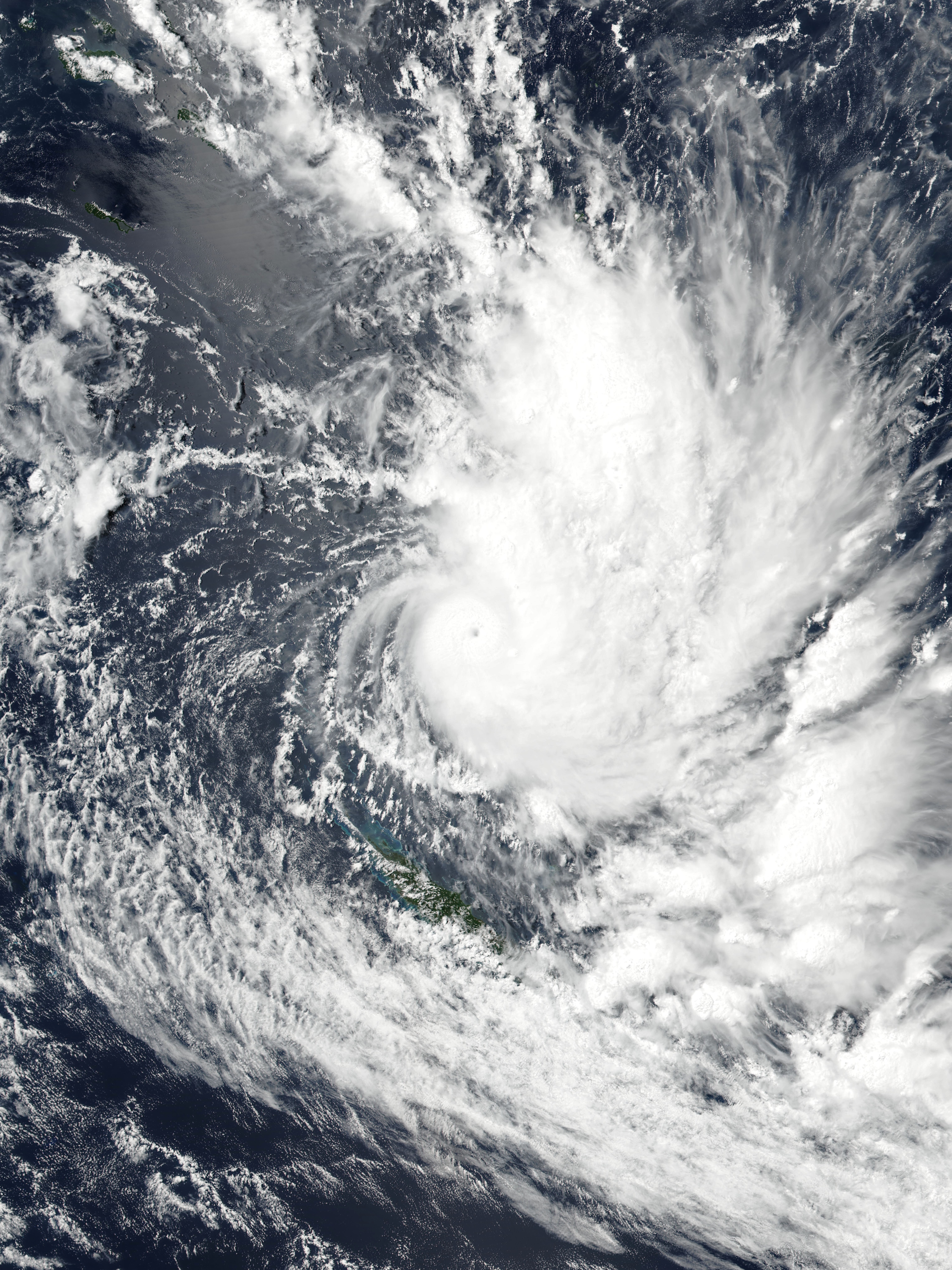
- Cyclone Hola at peak intensity on 8 March

Meteorological history
- Formed: 3 March 2018
- Extratropical: 11 March 2018
- Dissipated: 13 March 2018

Category 4 severe tropical cyclone
- 10-minute sustained (FMS)
- Highest winds: 165 km/h (105 mph)
- Lowest pressure: 952 hPa (mbar); 28.11 inHg

Category 3-equivalent tropical cyclone
- 1-minute sustained (SSHWS/JTWC)
- Highest winds: 185 km/h (115 mph)
- Lowest pressure: 950 hPa (mbar); 28.05 inHg

Overall effects
- Fatalities: 3 total
- Areas affected: Fiji, Vanuatu, New Caledonia, New Zealand
- Part of the 2017–18 South Pacific cyclone season

Severe Tropical Cyclone Hola had significant effects across Vanuatu in March 2018, resulting in the deaths of three people. Forming as a broad tropical disturbance on 5 March, the system slowly consolidated over the next few days before developing into a tropical cyclone on 6 March. Afterwards, a pinhole eye began to emerge and rapid intensification ensued.

Cyclone Hola caused extensive damage in Vanuatu, damaging or destroying 1,709 structures, ruining crops, and killing three people.Impacts were most severe in Ambrym where half of the areas homes were damaged and people suffered from food shortages. Ambae, already dealing with the disruptive effects of a volcanic eruption, had major damage. Several other provinces reported varying degrees of lesser impact. Fiji, New Caledonia, and New Zealand were also affected by the cyclone. The former two experienced negligible effects while the latter saw heavy rain and strong winds. Effects in New Zealand were less than initially feared, and local media called it a "lucky escape".

== Meteorological history ==
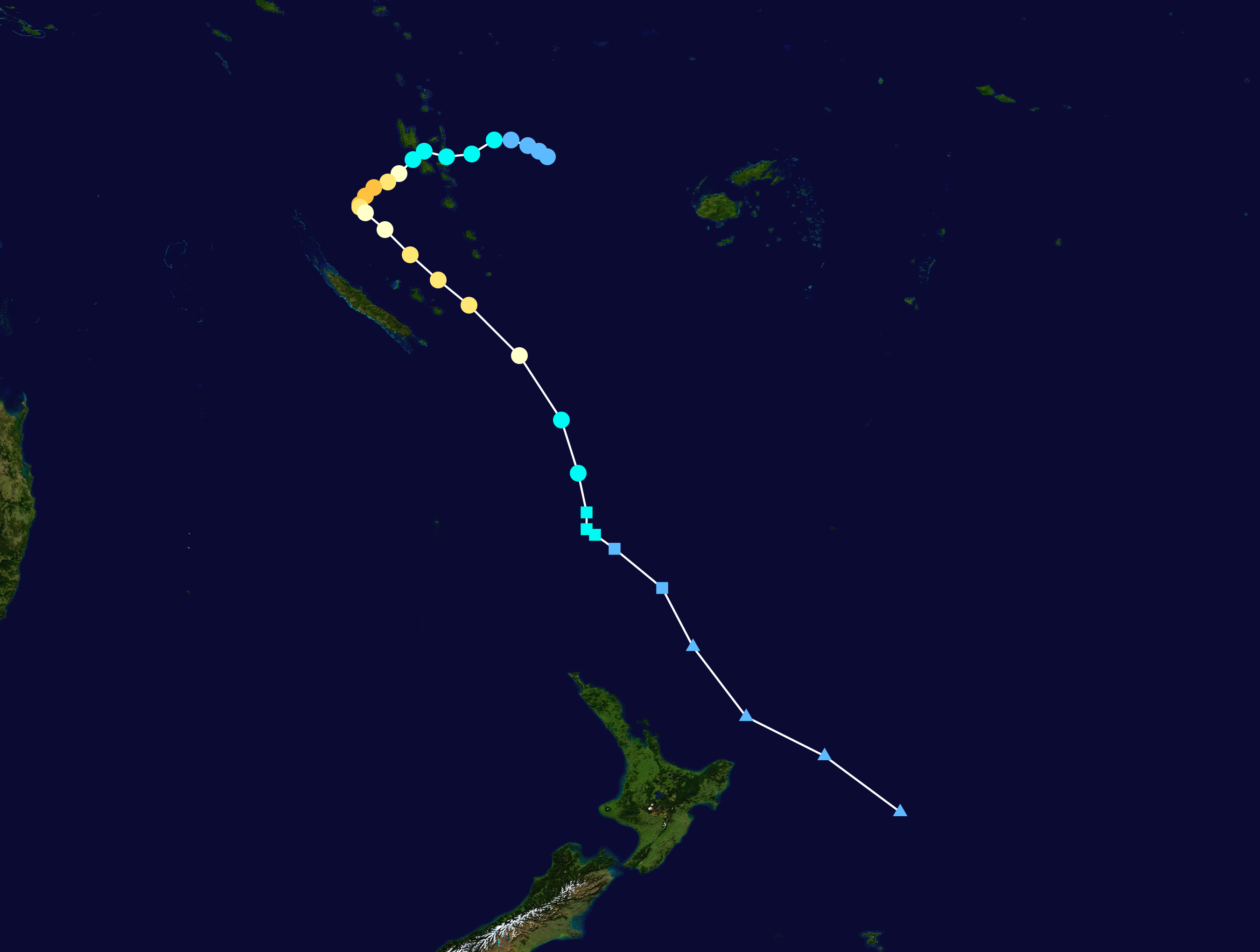
Map plotting the storm's track and intensity, according to the Saffir–Simpson scale Map key Saffir–Simpson scale Tropical depression (≤38 mph, ≤62 km/h) Tropical storm (39–73 mph, 63–118 km/h) Category 1 (74–95 mph, 119–153 km/h) Category 2 (96–110 mph, 154–177 km/h) Category 3 (111–129 mph, 178–208 km/h) Category 4 (130–156 mph, 209–251 km/h) Category 5 (≥157 mph, ≥252 km/h) Unknown Storm type Tropical cyclone Subtropical cyclone Extratropical cyclone, remnant low, tropical disturbance, or monsoon depression

In early March 2018, a trough of low pressure extended across Fiji, resulting in inclement weather across a broad area. A poorly organized low developed within this trough to the northwest of Fiji, later being classified as Tropical Disturbance 03F by the Fiji Meteorological Service (FMS). The system produced persistent convection as it moved generally west-northwest toward Vanuatu under the influence of a subtropical ridge to the south. By 5 March, winds up to gale-force winds developed around the circulation and the FMS classified it as a tropical depression. Around the same time, the United States-based Joint Typhoon Warning Center also classified the system as a tropical depression, assigning it the identifier 12P. The following day, convection became increasingly organized and consolidated around the cyclone's center with banding features forming around its periphery. Satellite scatterometer data showed an area of gale-force winds along the north-eastern side of the storm and with the aforementioned development, the JTWC classified the system as a tropical cyclone with its center located 210 km (130 mi) north-northeast of Port Vila, Vanuatu. Similarly, the FMS upgraded the depression to a Category 1 tropical cyclone and assigned it the name Hola. Overall environmental conditions favored further intensification, marked by ample outflow aloft, high sea surface temperatures of 30 °C (86 °F), and moderate wind shear that was mitigated by the storm's westward trajectory. Conditions soon became even more favorable as shear decreased, raising the likelihood of rapid intensification. Indeed, Hola strengthened quickly as it approached north-eastern Vanuatu, with SSMIS imagery depicting a formative eye feature and winds reaching storm-force winds late on 6 March.

Hola crossed the islands of Ambrym and Pentecost on 6–7 March; interaction with the land masses of Vanuatu disrupted the storm's core temporarily. The system subsequently passed over the island of Malekula and moved into the Coral Sea during 7 March, where it rapidly consolidated and developed a 10 km (5 mi) pinhole eye. The FMS subsequently reported that Gita had become a Category 4 Severe Tropical Cyclone and predicted that Hola would peak as a Category 5 Severe Tropical Cyclone. However, during the following day Hola's eye weakened and became cloud filled, as it stalled to the west of Vanuatu. As a result, the FMS reported that the system had peaked as a Category 4 Severe Tropical Cyclone with 10-minute sustained winds of 165 km/h (105 mph). During 8 March, the JTWC also reported that Hola had peaked with 1-minute sustained winds of 185 km/h (115 mph), which made it equivalent to a Category 3 hurricane on the Saffir-Simpson Hurricane Wind Scale.

== Preparations and impact ==
During the nascent stages of the cyclone in early March, heavy rain alerts were issued for the entirety of Fiji with accumulations in excess of 100 mm (3.9 in) likely. Rains from the trough and associated disturbance affected Fiji from 1–6 March. Météo-France raised a pre-cyclone alert for the whole of New Caledonia on 7 March. A level 2 alert, the second highest, was issued for Lifou, Maré, and Ouvéa on 9 March, prompting the closure of businesses and schools. Initial reports upon the passage of Hola indicated minimal damage across the territory.

=== Vanuatu ===
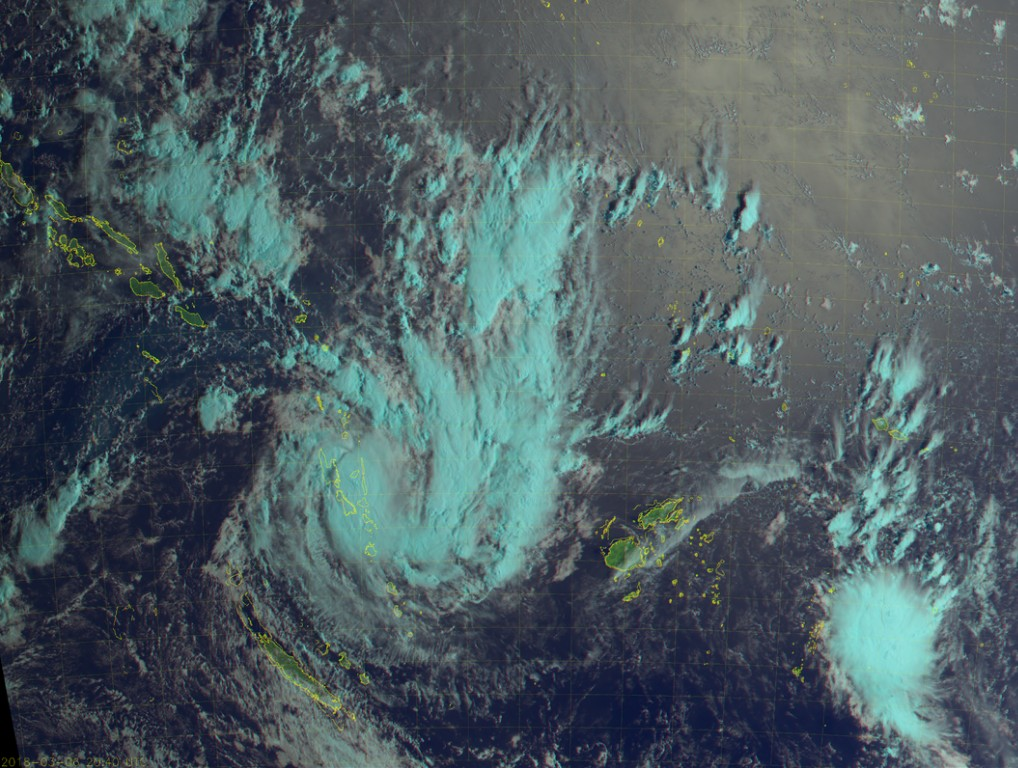
False-color imagery of Cyclone Hola over Vanuatu on 6 March

During the cyclone's passage, the Vanuatu Meteorology and Geo-Hazard Department issued a "red alert" for Malampa, Penama, Sanma, and Shefa provinces. Airports and schools were shuttered across the nation.

Nationwide damage assessments revealed 1,467 homes damaged or destroyed, 83 community buildings damaged or destroyed, and 159 schools affected. Crops suffered upwards of 70–90 percent damage in the affected regions. Malampa Province was hardest-hit, with Ambrym sustaining the most significant damage. An estimated 50 percent of homes on the island were damaged, of which about 80 percent were made with local materials. The Nebul Health Centre sustained some damage. Extensive damage to local crops created food shortages. Approximately 6 percent of the housing infrastructure across the province was damaged, and agriculture suffered extensive losses. Underwater drinking systems were compromised, leaving residents without access to clean water. The MV Rosali wrecked off the coast of Malakula. Damage across Penama was largely confined to southern Pentecost Island, with multiple homes were damaged or destroyed. There, one person was killed and two others were injured. The island's water supply was damaged and briefly unavailable before being restored by locals. Facilities at the Pangi Health Centre had minor damage. Crops sustained significant losses across Ambae Island. Coinciding with the eruption of the Manaro Voui volcano, heavy rainfall from Hola mixed with heavy ashfall to create acid rain and a 5 mm (0.20 in) accumulation of ash in southern parts of Ambae. In April, heavy rainfall from Cyclone Keni caused further damage on the island. Minor damage occurred in Shefa, Sanma, and Tafea provinces, with communications in the latter disrupted in Aneityum. Two children drowned in a swollen river on Espiritu Santo.

Following the storm's passage, the Vanuatu National Disaster Management Office conducted aerial damage assessments and coordinated with local agencies to begin relief efforts. An initial fund of 10 million vatu (US$90,000) was provided to conduct these surveys. Damage to infrastructure left many areas isolated, with parts of eastern Pentecost only accessible by bush trekking. On 21 March, Vanuatu Minister of Health Jerome Ludvaune asked the government to declare a major disaster for North Malakula, stating the damage there was similar to Cyclone Pam. By 23 March, inadequate relief efforts led to victims stealing food in Malekula. By early April distribution of relief goods was underway, with various affected areas receiving 107.5 kg (237 lb) of rice, 9,567 cartons of tinned tuna, 27,150 L (7,170 US gal) of water, 1,600 L (420 US gal) of gasoline, 243 shelter kits, and 535 tarpaulins. Furthermore, 40 million vatu (US$360,000) in funds was provided for West and South Ambae toward recovery from Hola and the Manaro Voui volcanic eruption. UNICEF provided 955 WASH kits, benefiting 4,775 people. The agency distributed pamphlets in the Bislama language to ensure proper knowledge of the given materials. Nationwide, total fiscal needs were calculated at 632 million vatu (US$5.66 million), of which only 14 percent was allocated for. An increase in mosquitoes carrying Plasmodium vivax occurred in the storm's wake. A small increase in diarrhea also occurred, with 11–14 reported cases. Short- and long-term recovery plans for the two disasters totaled 1.1 billion vatu (US$10.6 million), with immediate efforts focused on food security and shelter and long-term efforts focused on education. Transform Aid International in conjunction with Baptist Churches Vanuatu provided rice to 53 families. The China Civil Engineering Construction Company provided logistics assistance to the Malampa Government and supported local community activities. A three-month state of emergency was enacted on 13 April, with a Joint Police Force deployed for security and assistance. The national government and provincial government of Penma coordinated relocation plans for displaced residents on Ambae with completion expected by 15 May. Hola contributed to the largest-ever supplemental budget in Vanuatu, with a proposed spending bill of 940 million vatu (US$8.4 million).

=== New Zealand ===
Infrared satellite animation of Cyclone Hola weakening on approach to New Zealand on 10 March

Hola was the third former tropical cyclone in just over a month to impact New Zealand, following Fehi and Gita in February. The New Zealand MetService raised alerts for heavy rain, strong winds, and rough seas in relation to Hola, primarily for northern areas of the country. Local emergency services advised residents to take "basic precautions", including clearing of debris, securing loose outdoor furniture, clearing gutters, and checking ship moorings. An estimated 80 surfers took to Mount Maunganui to ride 2 m (6.6 ft) waves on 11 March; farther offshore, waves were estimated to be 9 m (30 ft). Air New Zealand cancelled flights at Whangarei Airport and Kerikeri Airport while Vector Limited placed crews on standby for possible power outages. Fire and Emergency New Zealand dispersed extra resources to East Coast for rapid response measures. Thirteen families were evacuated from Bella Vista within Tauranga due to concerns over beach erosion. Effects from the cyclone turned out to be less than anticipated, with reporters calling it a "lucky escape". Rainfall in some areas exceeded 100 mm (3.9 in), with 105 mm (4.1 in) measured near Tolaga Bay and estimated accumulations of 90 to 100 mm (3.5 to 3.9 in) in the Coromandel Range. Winds were strongest at the northern reaches of the North Island, where gusts reached 122 km/h (76 mph) in Kaeo. Farther south near Auckland, peak gusts ranged from 60 to 70 km/h (37 to 43 mph).

== See also ==
- Weather of 2018
- Tropical cyclones in 2018
- Cyclone Donna
- Cyclone Bola
