= Holler (album) =

Studio album by Amy Ray
- Released: September 28, 2018
- Recorded: 10 days in January 2018
- Studios: Principal recording at Echo Mountain Recording, Asheville, North Carolina, United States, additional studios include: Albany Recording Studio, Albany, Georgia, United States; The Barn, Washington; Blackbird Studio; MOXE; Nickel Jones Studios, Los Angeles, California, United States; The Old Pillow Studio; The Studio Nashville
- Genre: Country music
- Length: 52:52
- Language: English
- Label: Daemon
- Producer: Brian Speiser

Amy Ray chronology
The Tender Hour: Amy Ray Live from Seattle (2015)	Holler (2018)	If It All Goes South (2022)

Holler is a studio album by American folk rock singer-songwriter Amy Ray, released on Daemon Records in 2018. The music on this album continues Ray's exploration of Americana music and Appalachian culture and has received positive reviews from critics.

== Reception ==
Editors at AllMusic Guide chose Holler as among the Best of 2018, rating this album 4.5 out of five stars, with critic Timothy Monger praising her exploration of country music and opining that "Ray's powerful voice delivers personal ruminations, affirmations, history lessons, and the fiery politicized missives and cultural reflections that come from a lifetime of activism". Stuart Henderson of Exclaim! gave Holler an eight out of 10, calling Ray "a remarkably wise and generous songwriter" who is "backed by a versatile band".

== Track listing ==
All songs written by Amy Ray, except where noted. All lyrics by Amy Ray.

1. "Gracie’s Dawn (Prelude)" (Brian Speiser) – 0:42
2. "Sure Feels Good Anyway" – 4:30
3. "Dadgum Down" – 4:27
4. "Last Taxi Fare" – 4:32
5. "Old Lady Interlude" – 1:09
6. "Sparrow’s Boogie" – 4:05
7. "Oh City Man" (words: Amy Ray, music: Ray, Jeff Fielder, Matt Smith, Kerry Brooks and Adrian Carter) – 4:20
8. "Fine with the Dark" – 3:18
9. "Tonight I’m Paying the Rent" – 4:18
10. "Holler" (words: Ray, music: Ray, Fielder) – 3:41
11. "Jesus Was a Walking Man" – 3:34
12. "Sparrow’s Lullaby" – 0:55
13. "Bondsman (Evening in Missouri)" – 4:52
14. "Didn’t Know a Damn Thing" / "Old Lady Dreaming" – 8:38

== Personnel ==
=== Band ===
- Amy Ray – vocals (except 1), acoustic guitar (2, 5, 7–9, 11, 12, 14), electric guitar (4, 6, 10, 13), arrangement (5)
- Jim Brock – drums and percussion (except 5, 12)
- Kerry Brooks – upright bass (1, 3, 5, 7, 9, 10, 12, 13), electric bass (2, 4, 6, 14), mandolin (11)
- Alison Brown – banjo (3, 5–7, 9, 11, 12, 14), banjola (4), acoustic guitar (7)
- Kofi Burbridge – piano (1, 4, 9, 10, 13), Wurlitzer (2, 5, 12), Rhodes piano (3, 14), Hammond B3 organ (6, 11)
- Adrian Carter – Teo octave 12-string (4, 7, 10,), fiddle (6, 9, 12, 13, 14)
- Jeff Fielder – acoustic guitar (1, 3, 5, 7, 13), vocals (1), electric guitar (2, 4, 6, 9, 14), acoustic dobro (10, 12), upright bass (11), electric baritone guitar (3)
- Matt Smith – pedal steel guitar (1–4, 6, 9, 10, 13, 15), acoustic guitar (5, 12), acoustic dobro (7, 11)

=== Vocalists ===
- Adrian Carter, Brian Speiser, Jeff Fielder – vocals (1), harmonies (2, 12)
- Lucy Wainwright Roche – harmonies (3)
- Vince Gill and Brandi Carlile – harmonies (4)
- Lucy Wainwright Roche, Brian Speiser – harmonies (7)
- The Wood Brothers (Oliver Wood, Chris Wood, Jane Rix) – harmonies (9–10, the former with Jeff Fielder)
- Brian Speiser – harmonies (10)
- Rutha Mae Harris of The Freedom Singers – special guest (11)
- Phil Cook, Justin Vernon – harmonies (14)

=== String section (tracks 1, 2, 4–6, 12, 13) ===
- Adrian Carter, Lyndsey Pruett – violins
- Matt Williams – viola
- Franklin Keel – cello
- Arrangements: Adrian Carter and Brian Speiser (1, 2, 4, 6, 13), Carter and Kerry Brooks (5), Carter alone (12)

=== Horns ===
- Jordan Hamlin, Justin Ray, Alex Bradley – trumpets (1, 2, 4, 6)
- Jordan Hamlin, Brian Speiser – additional horns (6)
- Jordan Hamlin – French horn (13)
- Jordan Katz – trumpet (9, 13, 14)
- Shaunte Palmer – trombone (9, 14)
- David Ralicke – baritone saxophone (9, 13, 14), tenor saxophones (9, 14)
- Garrick Smith – baritone saxophone (1, 2, 4, 6)
- Arrangements: Brian Speiser (1), Kofi Burbridge (2, 4, 6, 13), Jordan Katz, and David Ralicke (9), Katz (14)

=== Guest musicians ===
- Derek Trucks – electric guitar (13)

== See also ==
- List of 2018 albums
