= 2017–18 South Pacific cyclone season =

Tropical cyclone season

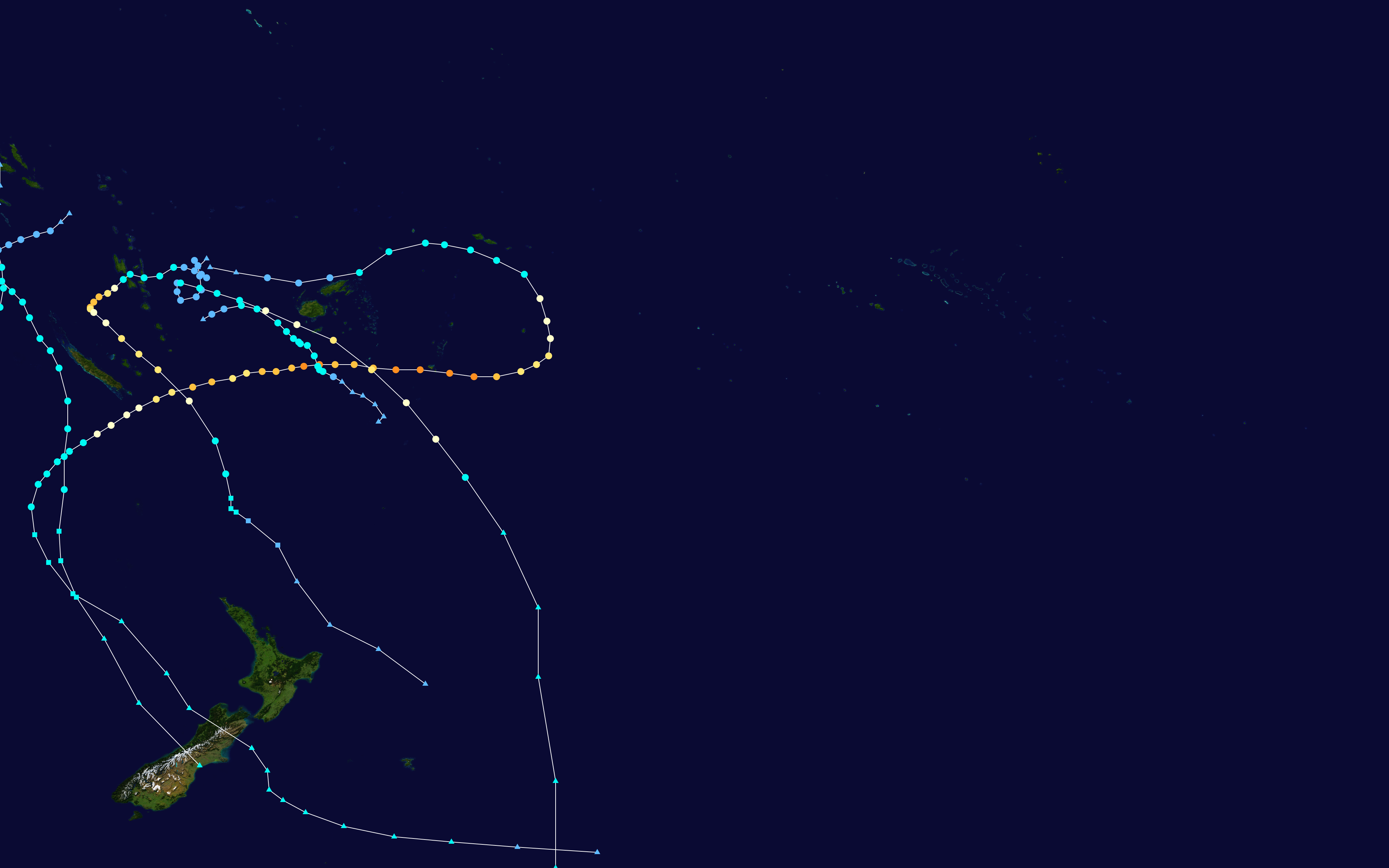
- Season summary map

Seasonal boundaries
- First system formed: December 16, 2017
- Last system dissipated: April 20, 2018

Strongest storm
- Name: Gita
  - Maximum winds: 205 km/h (125 mph) (10-minute sustained)
  - Lowest pressure: 927 hPa (mbar)

Seasonal statistics
- Total disturbances: 14, 1 unofficial
- Total depressions: 10, 1 unofficial
- Tropical cyclones: 6, 1 unofficial
- Severe tropical cyclones: 3
- Total fatalities: 11 total
- Total damage: $377 million (2017 USD)

Related articles
- 2017–18 Australian region cyclone season; 2017–18 South-West Indian Ocean cyclone season

The 2017–18 South Pacific cyclone season was a slightly below-average season that produced 6 tropical cyclones, 3 of which became severe tropical cyclones. The season officially began on November 1, 2017, and ended on April 30, 2018; however, a tropical cyclone could have formed at any time between July 1, 2017, and June 30, 2018, and would count towards the season total. During the season, tropical cyclones were officially monitored by the Fiji Meteorological Service, MetService and the Australian Bureau of Meteorology, while the United States Joint Typhoon Warning Center (JTWC) also monitored the basin and issued warnings for American interests. The FMS attaches a number and an F suffix to significant tropical disturbances that form in or move into the basin, while the JTWC designates significant tropical cyclones with a number and a P suffix. The BoM, FMS and MetService all use the Australian Tropical Cyclone Intensity Scale and estimate wind speeds over a period of ten minutes, while the JTWC estimates sustained winds over a 1-minute period, which are subsequently compared to the Saffir–Simpson hurricane wind scale (SSHWS).

== Seasonal forecasts ==
Source/Record	Tropical Cyclone	Severe Tropical Cyclone	Ref
Record high:	1997–98: 16	1982–83: 10	
Record low:	2011–12: 3	2008–09: 0	
Average (1969–70 – 2016–17):	7.1	—	
NIWA October	8–10	3–4	
Fiji Meteorological Service	4–6	1–3	
Region	Chance of above average	Average number	Actual activity
Western South Pacific	48%	7	5
Eastern South Pacific	55%	4	0
Source:BOM's South Pacific Tropical Cyclone Season Outlook.

Ahead of the cyclone season, the Fiji Meteorological Service (FMS), Australian Bureau of Meteorology (BoM), New Zealand's MetService and National Institute of Water and Atmospheric Research (NIWA) and various other Pacific Meteorological services, all contributed towards the Island Climate Update tropical cyclone outlook that was released during October 2016. The outlook took into account the ENSO-neutral conditions that had been observed across the Pacific and analogue seasons that had ENSO-neutral and weak La Niña conditions occurring during the season. The outlook called for a near average number of tropical cyclones for the 2017–18 season, with eight to ten named tropical cyclones, to occur between 135°E and 120°W compared to an average of about 10. At least three of the tropical cyclones were expected to become Category 3 severe tropical cyclones, while two could become Category 4 severe tropical cyclones; they also noted that a Category 5 severe tropical cyclone was not likely to occur during the season.

In addition to contributing towards the Island Climate Update outlook, the FMS and the BoM issued their own seasonal forecasts for the South Pacific region. The BoM issued two seasonal forecasts for the Southern Pacific Ocean, for their self-defined eastern and western regions of the South Pacific Ocean. They predicted that the Western region between 142.5°E and 165°E, had a 48% chance of seeing activity above its average of 7 tropical cyclones. The BoM also predicted that the Eastern Region between 165°E and 120°W, had a 55% chance of seeing activity above its average of 4 tropical cyclones. Within their outlook the FMS predicted that between four and six tropical cyclones, would occur within the basin compared to an average of around 7.1 cyclones. At least one of the tropical cyclones was expected to intensify into a Category 3 or higher severe tropical cyclone. They also predicted that the main area for tropical cyclogenesis would be within the Coral Sea, to the west of the International Date Line.

Both the Island Climate Update and the FMS tropical cyclone outlooks assessed the risk of a tropical cyclone affecting a certain island or territory. The Island Climate Update Outlook predicted that New Caledonia, Tonga, New Zealand and Papua New Guinea had an above average chance of being impacted by a tropical cyclone or their remnants. They also predicted that the Solomon Islands, Fiji and Vanuatu had a near normal to normal risk of being impacted by one or more tropical cyclones. The Southern Cook Islands, American Samoa, Samoa, Niue, Tokelau, Tuvalu, as well as Wallis and Futuna were thought to have a below average chance of being impacted. It was also considered unlikely that the Northern Cook Islands, French Polynesia, Kiribati and the Pitcairn Islands would be affected by a tropical cyclone. The FMS's outlook predicted that Vanuatu, New Caledonia, Fiji as well as Wallis and Futuna had a normal chance of being impacted by a tropical cyclone. The outlook also predicted that the Solomon Islands, Tokelau, Samoa, Tonga, Niue, Cook Islands and French Polynesia had a reduced chance of being affected by a tropical cyclone. It was thought that there was a normal risk of Vanuatu, New Caledonia, Fiji and Samoa being impacted by at least one severe tropical cyclone, while other areas such as the Solomon Islands, Tokelau, Samoa, Tonga, Niue and French Polynesia, had a reduced chance of being impacted by a severe tropical cyclone.

== Systems ==
=== Tropical Depression 04F ===
- Tropical depression (Australian scale)
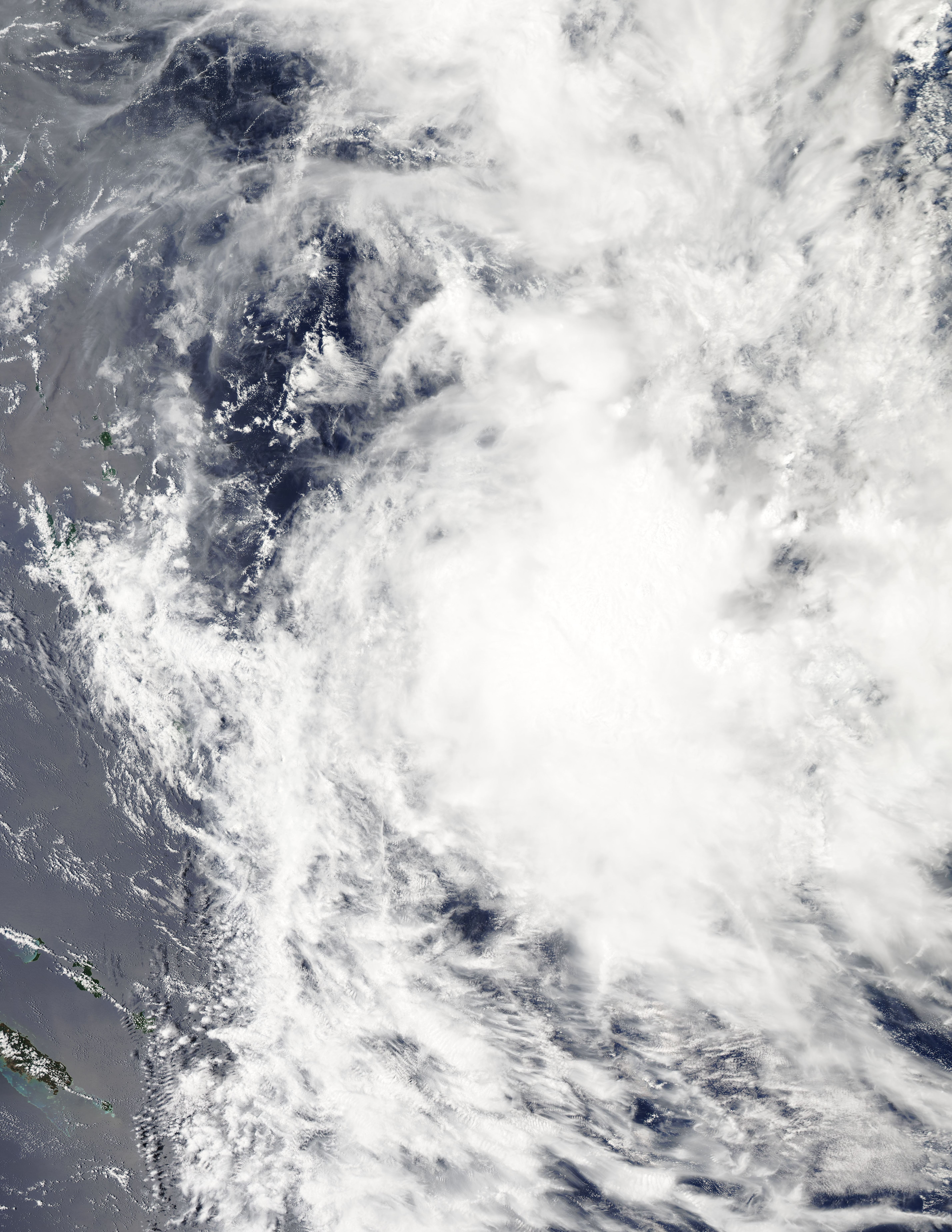
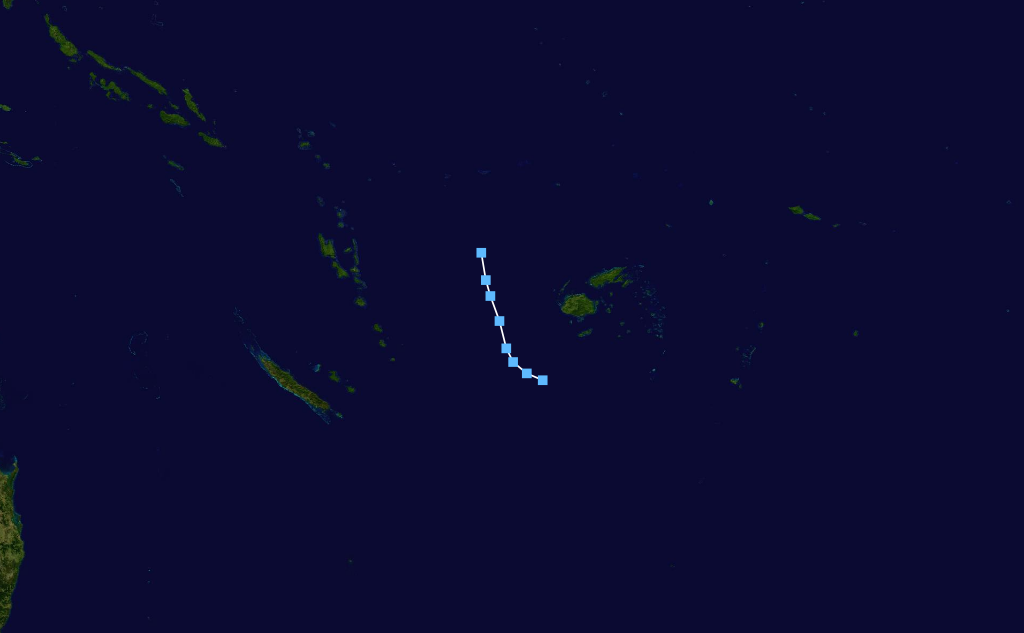
- Duration: December 20 – December 26
- Peak intensity: Winds not specified; 998 hPa (mbar)

This depression formed east of Fiji on December 20th, and tried to strengthen while drifting south-east. However, it encountered harsh wind shear which prevented any further development and sheared off all the circulation to the south-east quadrant. It dissipated on December 26th.

=== Tropical Disturbance 05F ===
- Tropical disturbance (Australian scale)
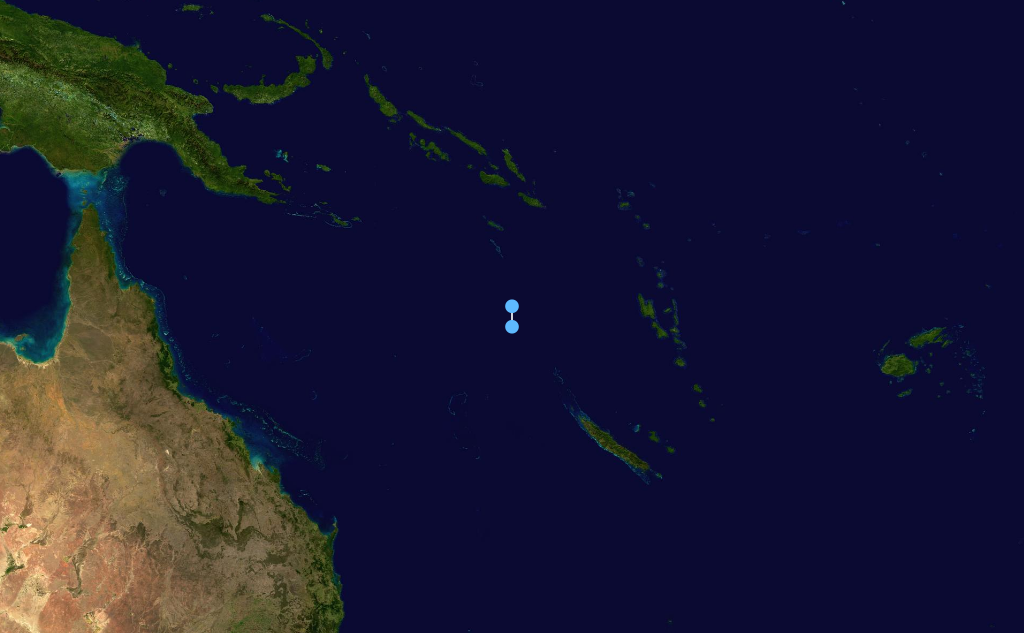
- Duration: January 26 – January 27
- Peak intensity: Winds not specified; 996 hPa (mbar)

Formed on January 26, dissipated the next day, 27th. It never strengthened due to the wind shear.

=== Tropical Cyclone Fehi ===
- Category 1 tropical cyclone (Australian scale)
- Tropical storm (SSHWS)
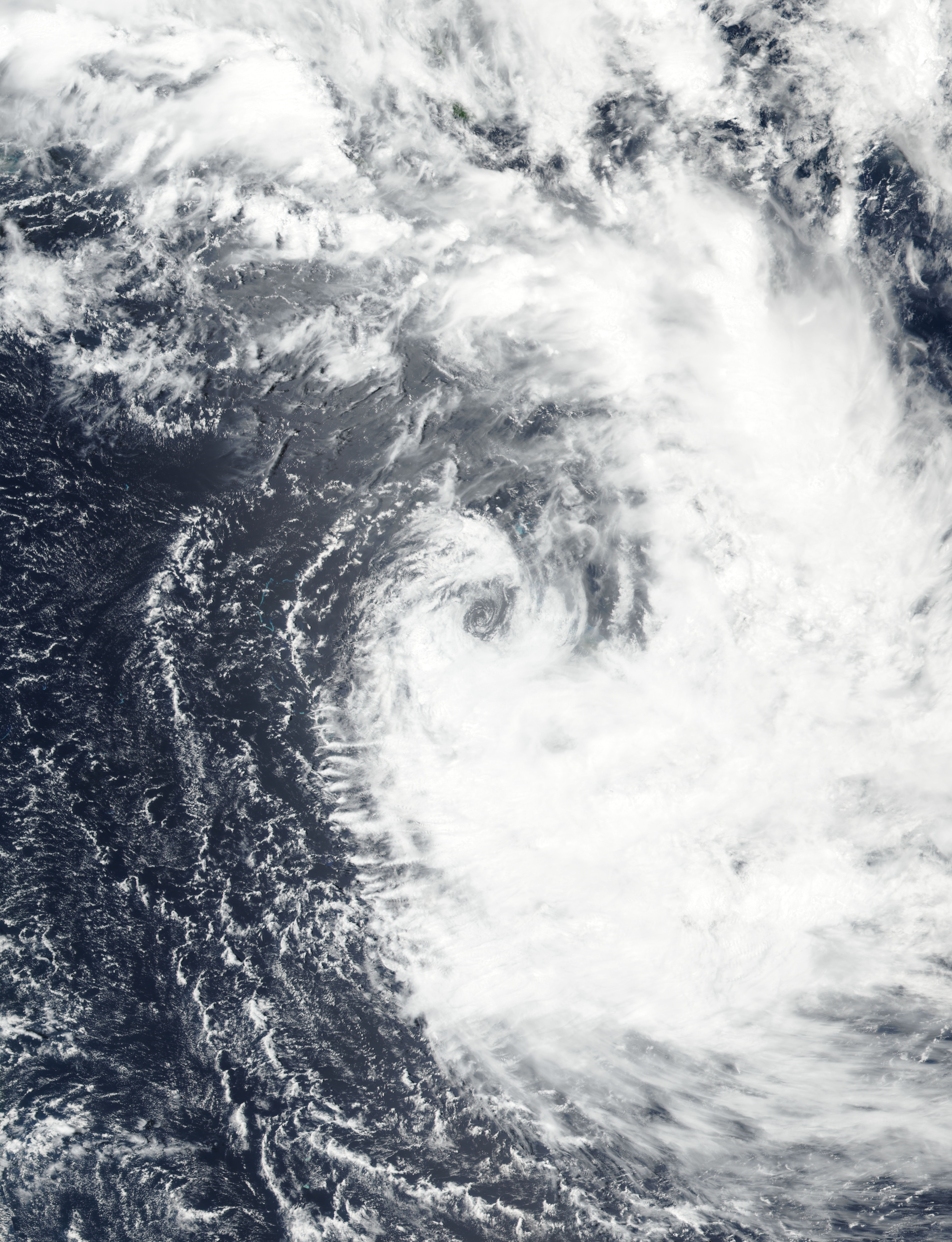
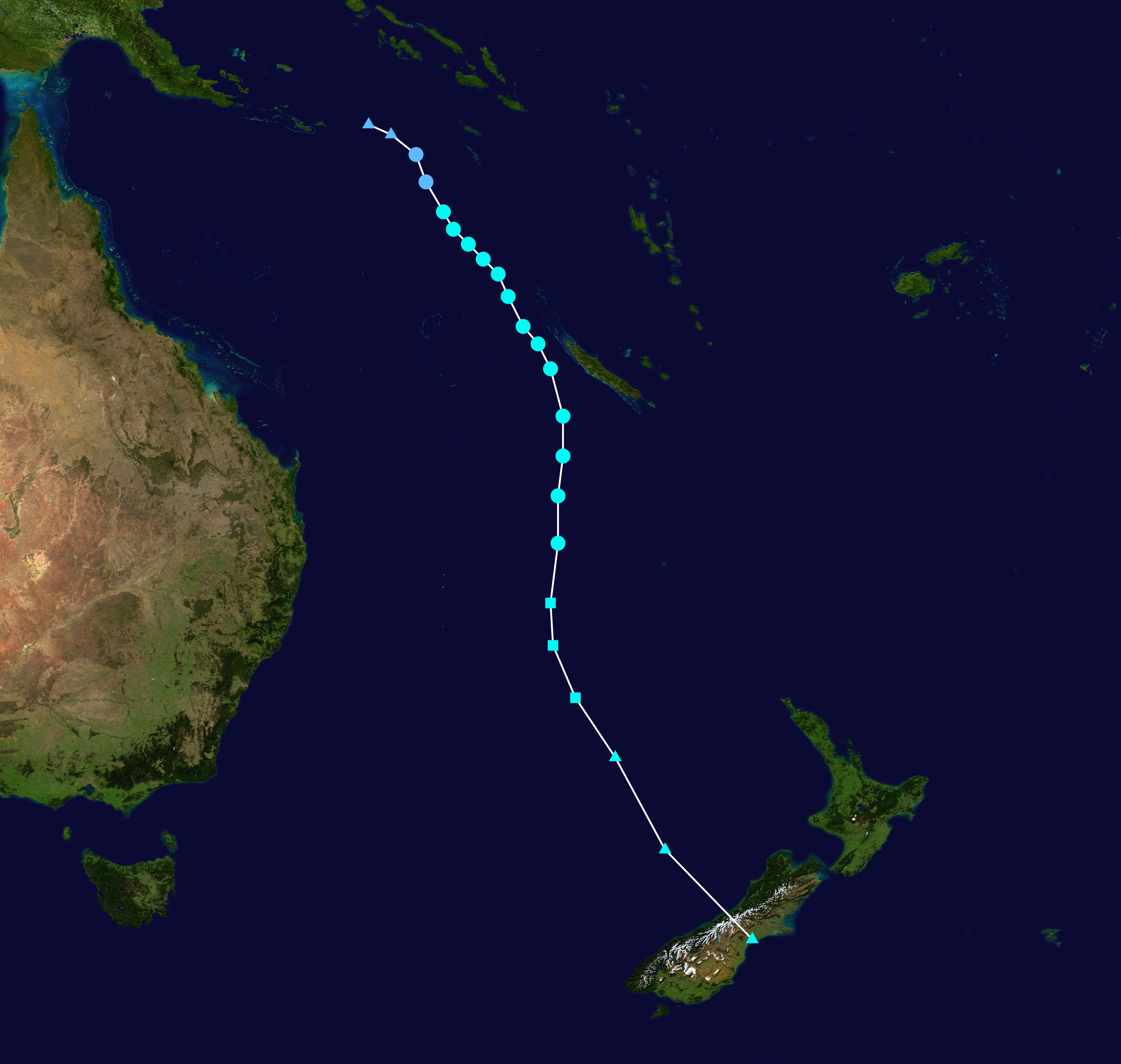
- Duration: January 28 (Entered basin) – January 30
- Peak intensity: 85 km/h (50 mph) (10-min); 986 hPa (mbar)

Fehi entered the South Pacific basin from the Australian Region on 28th as a subtropical cyclone. It continued its south-southeast track while transitioning to an extratropical cyclone as it approached New Zealand.

As an extratropical cyclone, Fehi caused extensive damage in western New Zealand. Strong winds and heavy rain damaged hundreds of structures, with more than 100 later condemned. Waist-deep water flooded homes in Charleston and Westport. Pounding surf eroded beaches, exposing an old garbage dump at Cobden Beach which left thousands of garbage bags strewn about. Insurance loss were amounted at NZ$38.5 million (US$28.5 million).

=== Severe Tropical Cyclone Gita ===
- Category 5 severe tropical cyclone (Australian scale)
- Category 4 tropical cyclone (SSHWS)
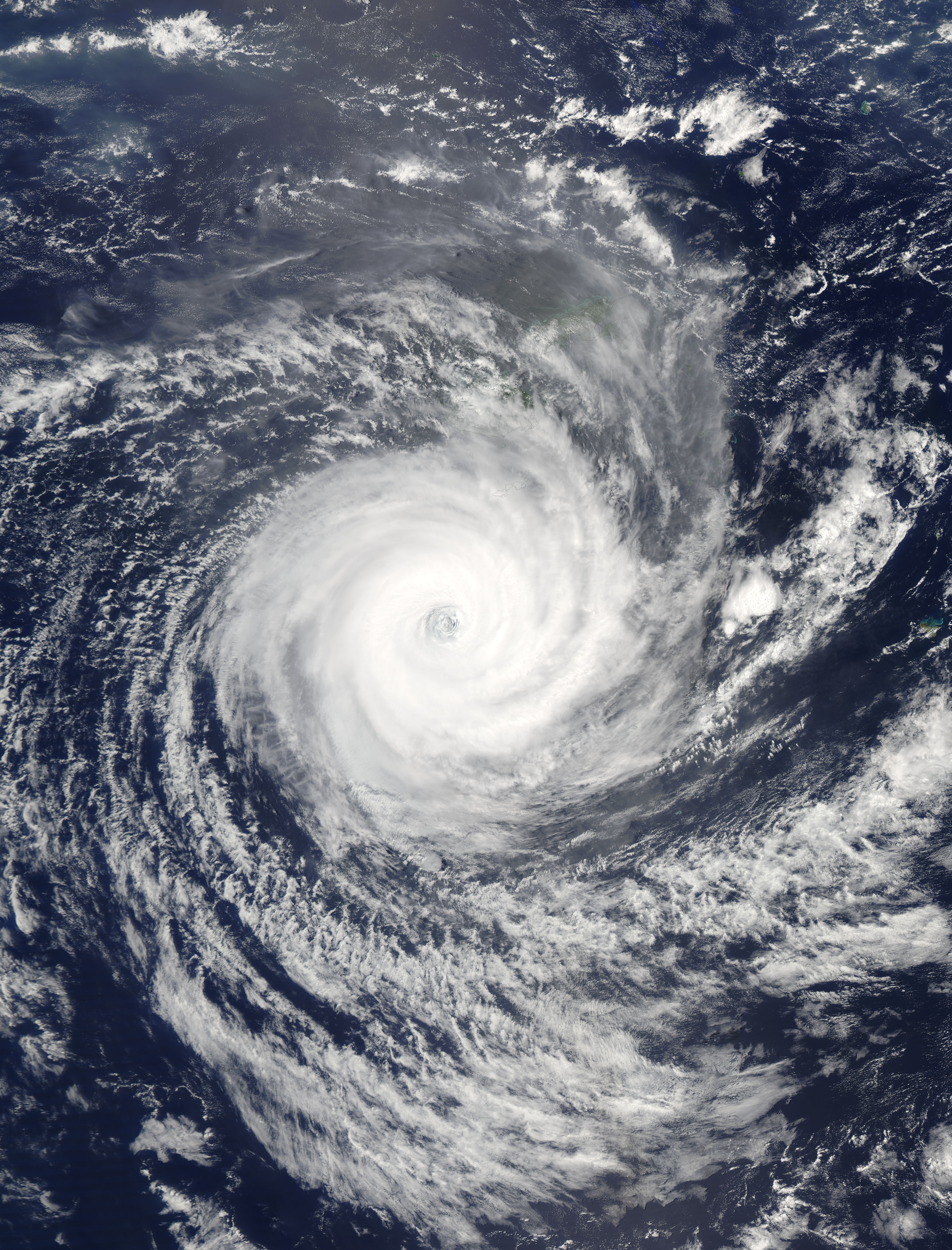
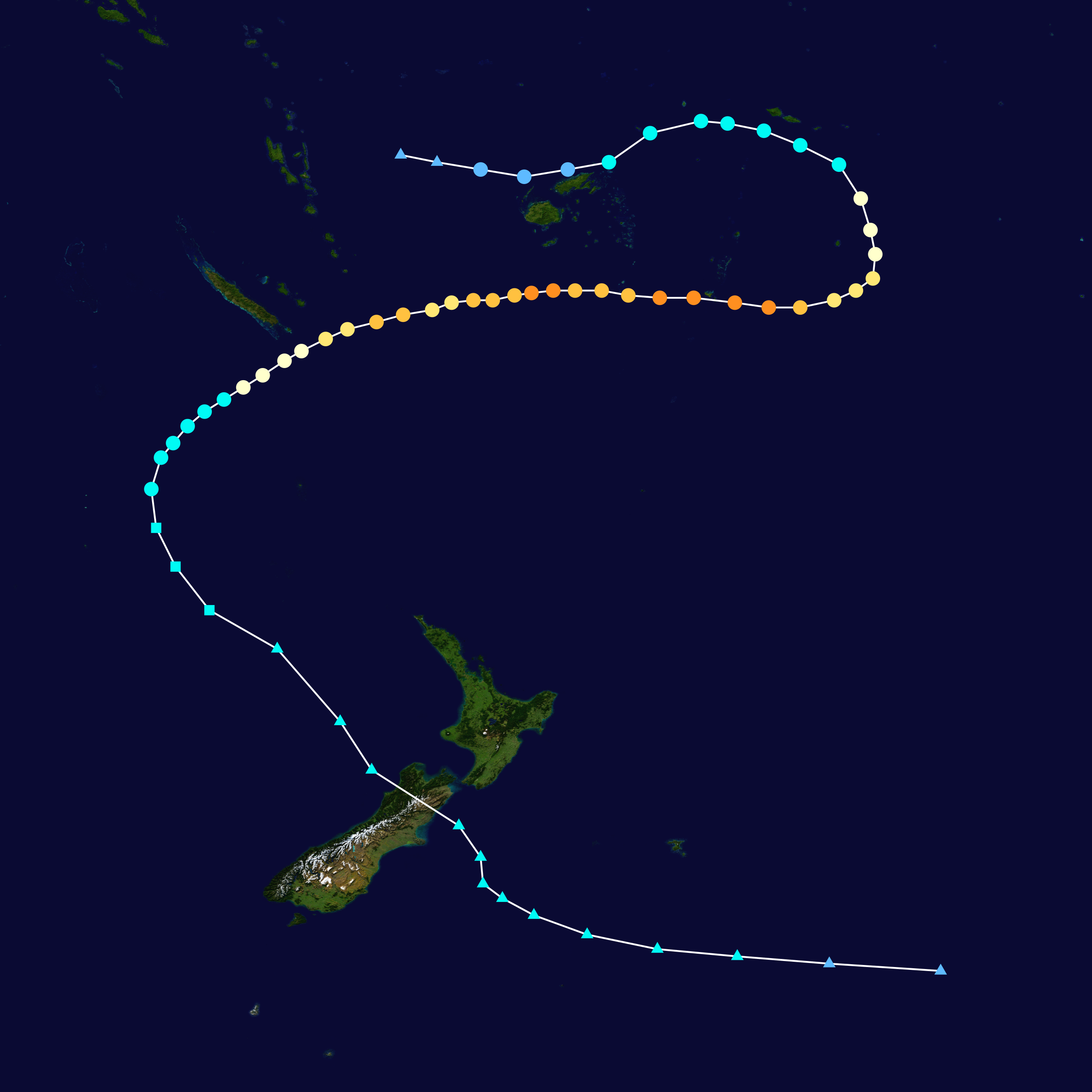
- Duration: February 3 – February 19
- Peak intensity: 205 km/h (125 mph) (10-min); 927 hPa (mbar)

On 3 February, the Fiji Meteorological Service (FMS) started to monitor Tropical Disturbance 07F, which had developed within a trough of low pressure, about 435 km (270 mi) to the southeast of Honiara in the Solomon Islands. Over the next couple of days, the system moved erratically near northern Vanuatu and remained poorly organized, with convection located to the south of the low-level circulation center. The system started to move south-eastwards on 5 February, towards the Fijian Islands and a favorable environment for further development. The system subsequently passed near the island nation during 8 February, where it developed into a tropical depression and started to move north-eastwards towards the Samoan Islands. On 9 February, the United States Joint Typhoon Warning Center (JTWC) initiated advisories on the system and designated it as Tropical Cyclone 09P, after an ASCAT image showed that it had winds of 65–75 km/h (40–45 mph) in its northern semicircle. The FMS subsequently named the system Tropical Cyclone Gita, after the United States National Weather Service Weather Forecast Office in Pago Pago requested that the system be named early for warning and humanitarian reasons.

After Gita was named, a prolonged period of rapid intensification ensued as it quickly intensified into a Category 1 tropical cyclone on the Australian tropical cyclone intensity scale, before it passed within 100 km (60 mi) of Samoa and American Samoa. After moving past the Samoan Islands, Gita turned southeast and then southwards. On 10 February, Gita rapidly intensified to a category 3 severe tropical cyclone on the Australian scale while traversing anomalously warm sea surface temperatures of between 28–29 °C (82–84 °F). On 11 February, Gita continued to intensify into a category 4 severe tropical cyclone. At the same time, Gita turned westward under the influence of a subtropical ridge to the south. At approximately 10:00 UTC (23:00 TOT) on 11 February, the cyclone passed about 30 km (20 mi) south of Tongatapu near its peak intensity, as a powerful Category 5 cyclone on the Australian Scale; the RSMC Nadi-based Australian scale and the JTWC-used Saffir–Simpson scale, with maximum 10-minute sustained winds of 205 km/h (125 mph). At the same time, the Joint Typhoon Warning Center estimated peak 1-minute sustained winds at 230 km/h (145 mph). This made Gita the strongest cyclone to strike Tonga in its recorded history.

=== Tropical Depression 08F ===
- Tropical depression (Australian scale)
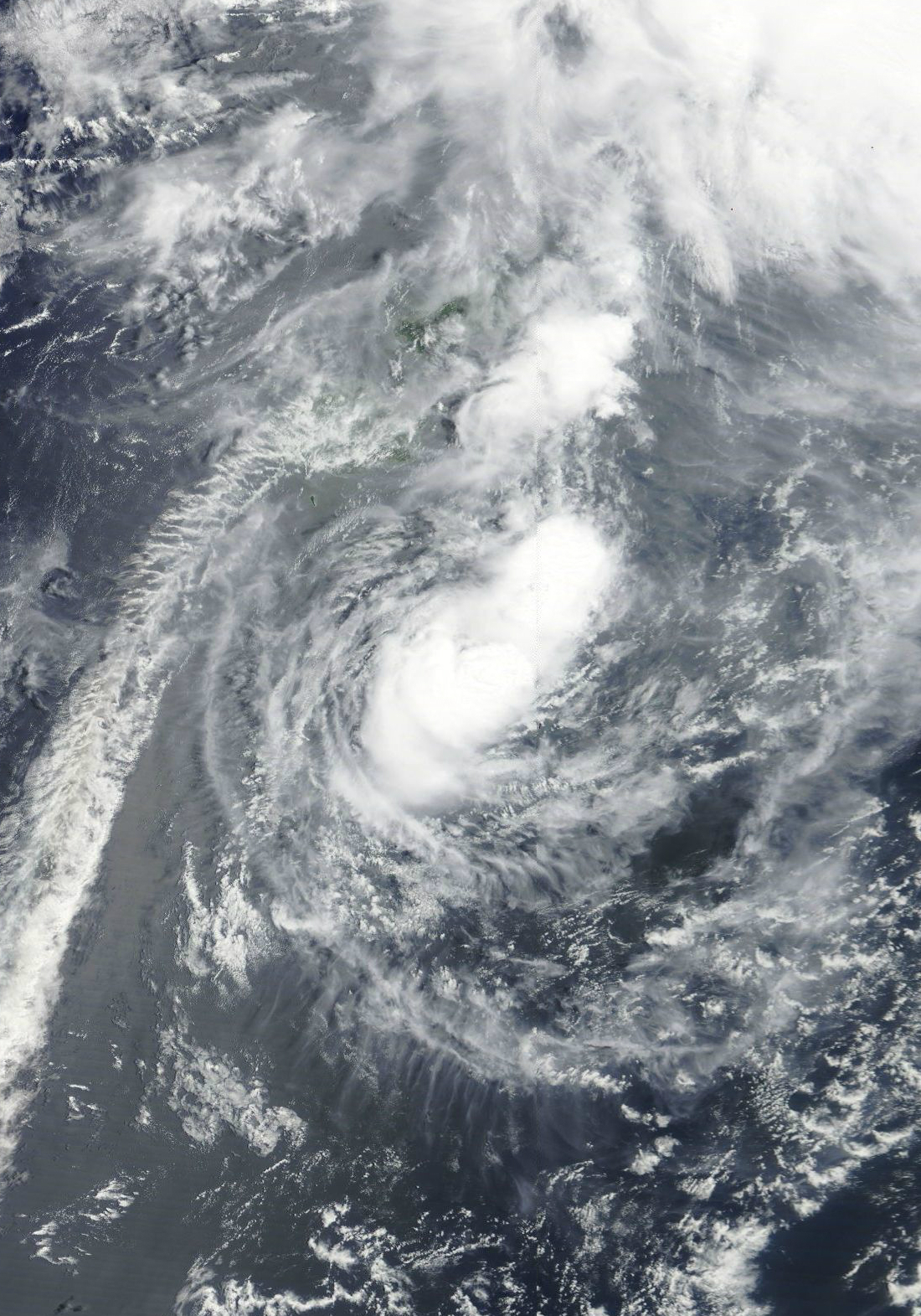
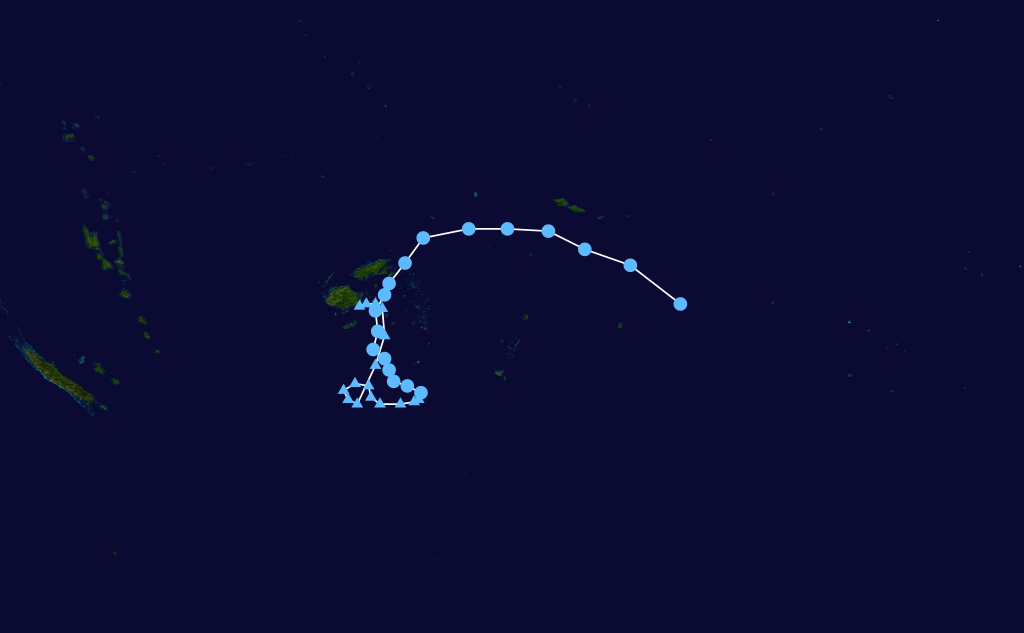
- Duration: February 3 – February 11
- Peak intensity: Winds not specified; 994 hPa (mbar)

This storm formed on February 3, 2018 to the east of Fiji, Tropical Depression 08F followed an erratic track; however, it didn't strengthen enough to become a category 1 and it dissipated on February 11, 2018.

=== Severe Tropical Cyclone Hola ===
- Category 4 severe tropical cyclone (Australian scale)
- Category 3 tropical cyclone (SSHWS)
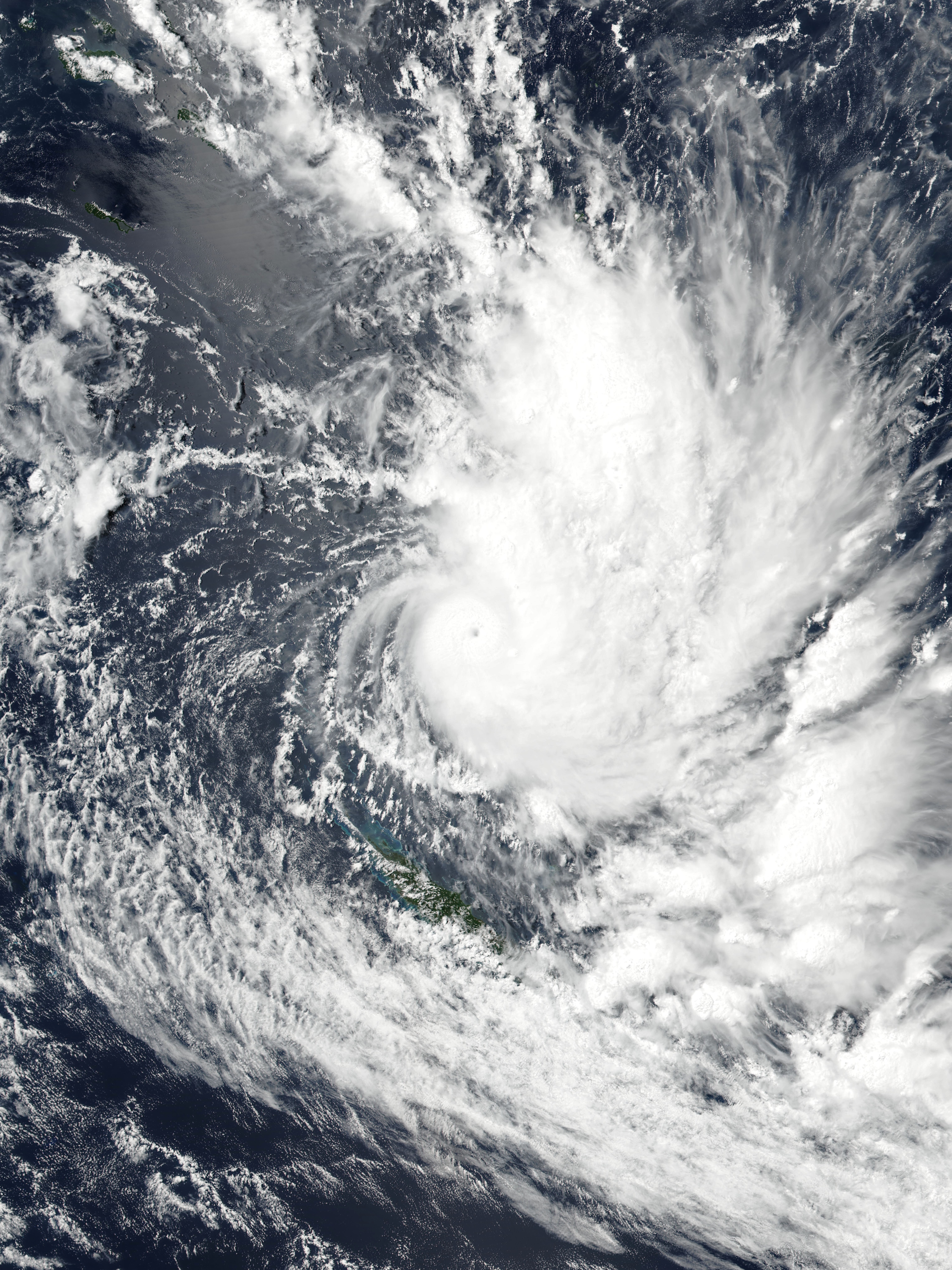
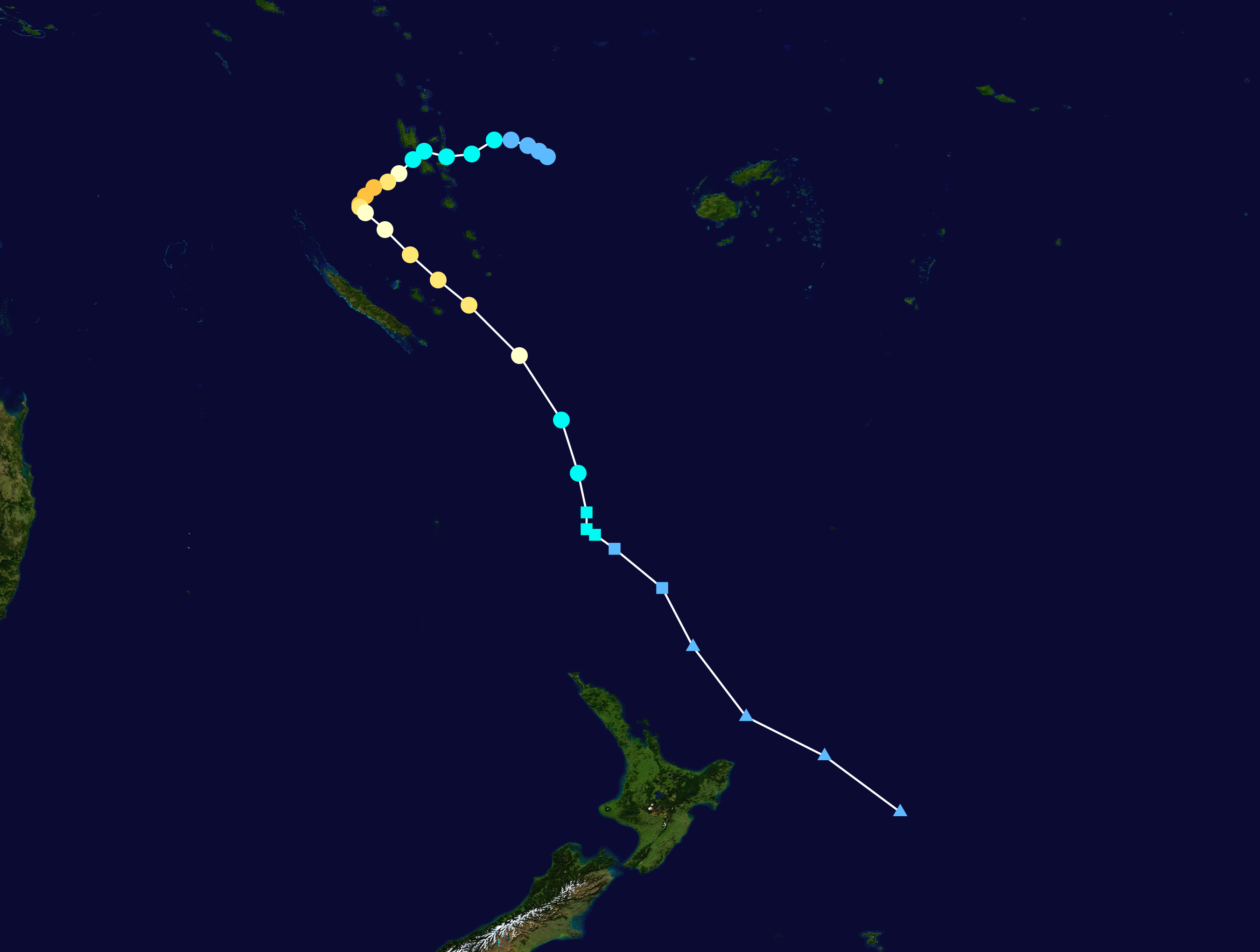
- Duration: March 3 – March 11
- Peak intensity: 165 km/h (105 mph) (10-min); 952 hPa (mbar)

During March 3, 2018 the Fiji Meteorological Service (FMS) reported that Tropical Disturbance 09F had developed within a trough of low pressure about 230 km (145 mi) to the northeast of Nadi, Fiji. At this time the disturbance had a broad low-level circulation and was located within a very favourable environment for further development, with low vertical wind shear and warm sea surface temperatures. Over the next couple of days, the disturbance gradually developed further as it gradually moved westwards towards Vanuatu, under the influence of a subtropical ridge of high pressure. It was subsequently classified as a tropical depression by the FMS during March 5, before the United States Joint Typhoon Warning Center (JTWC) subsequently issued a Tropical Cyclone Formation Alert on the system later that day.

During March 6, the JTWC initiated advisories on the system and designated it as Tropical Cyclone 12P, after its broad low-level circulation center had slowly consolidated and the overall organisation of the cyclone had improved. The FMS subsequently reported that the system had developed into a Category 1 tropical cyclone on the Australian tropical cyclone intensity scale and named it Hola while it was located about 80 km (50 mi) to the east of Pentecost Island in Vanuatu. After it was named, Hola started developing a weak low level eye feature, before it was classified as a category 2 tropical cyclone as it passed in between the islands of Pentecost and Ambrym. The system subsequently passed over the island of Malekula and moved into the Coral Sea during March 7, where it rapidly consolidated and developed a 10 km (5 mi) pinhole eye. The FMS subsequently reported that Hola had become a Category 4 severe tropical cyclone and predicted that Hola would peak as a Category 5 severe tropical cyclone.

After peaking as a Category 4 severe tropical cyclone on the Australian scale, wind shear rapidly weakened the system as it passed to the west of New Caledonia as a Category 1 tropical cyclone. It continued to the southwest before transitioning to an subtropical storm as it approached New Zealand. It weakened and it degenerated to a remnant low to the northwest of the country.

=== Tropical Depression 10F (Linda) ===
- Tropical depression (Australian scale)
- Tropical storm (SSHWS)
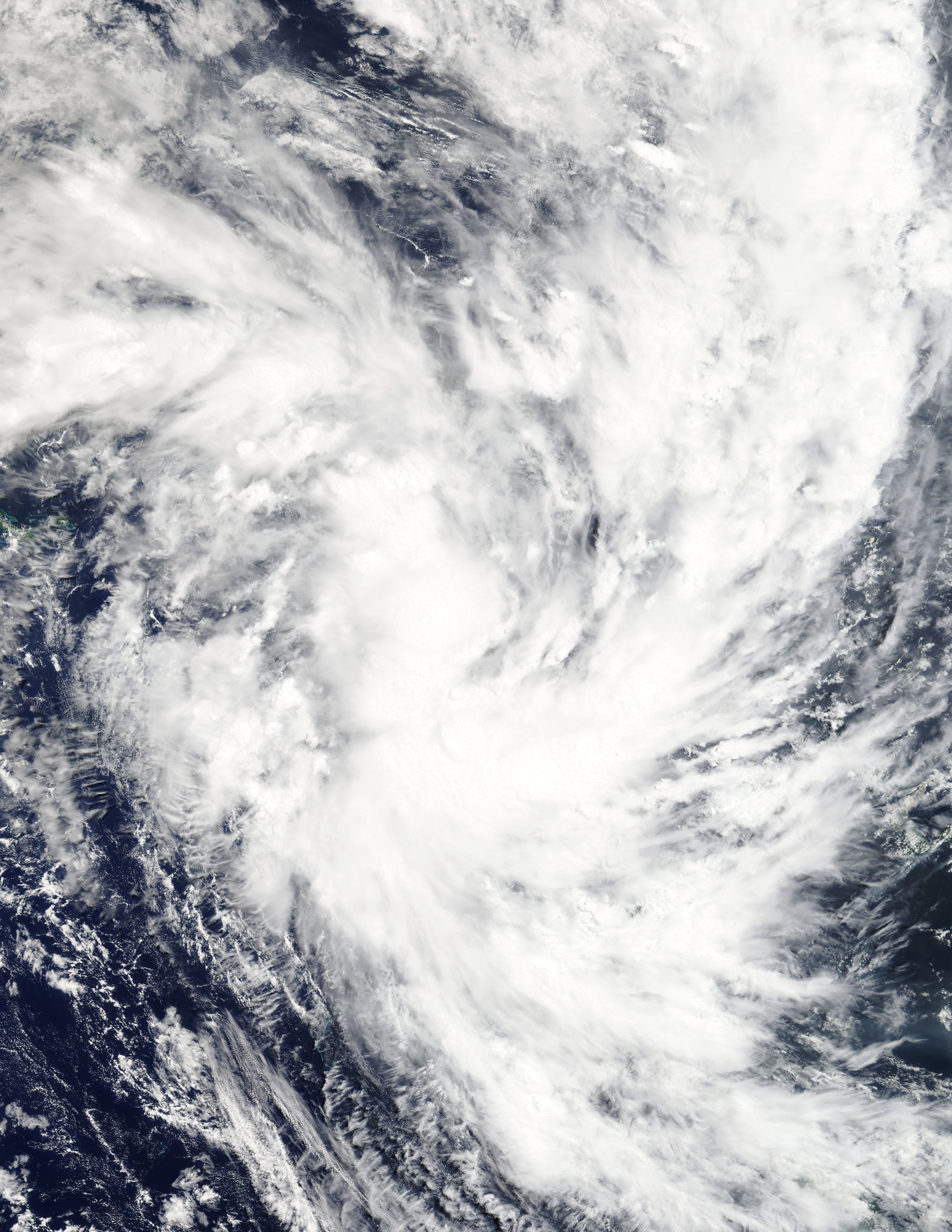
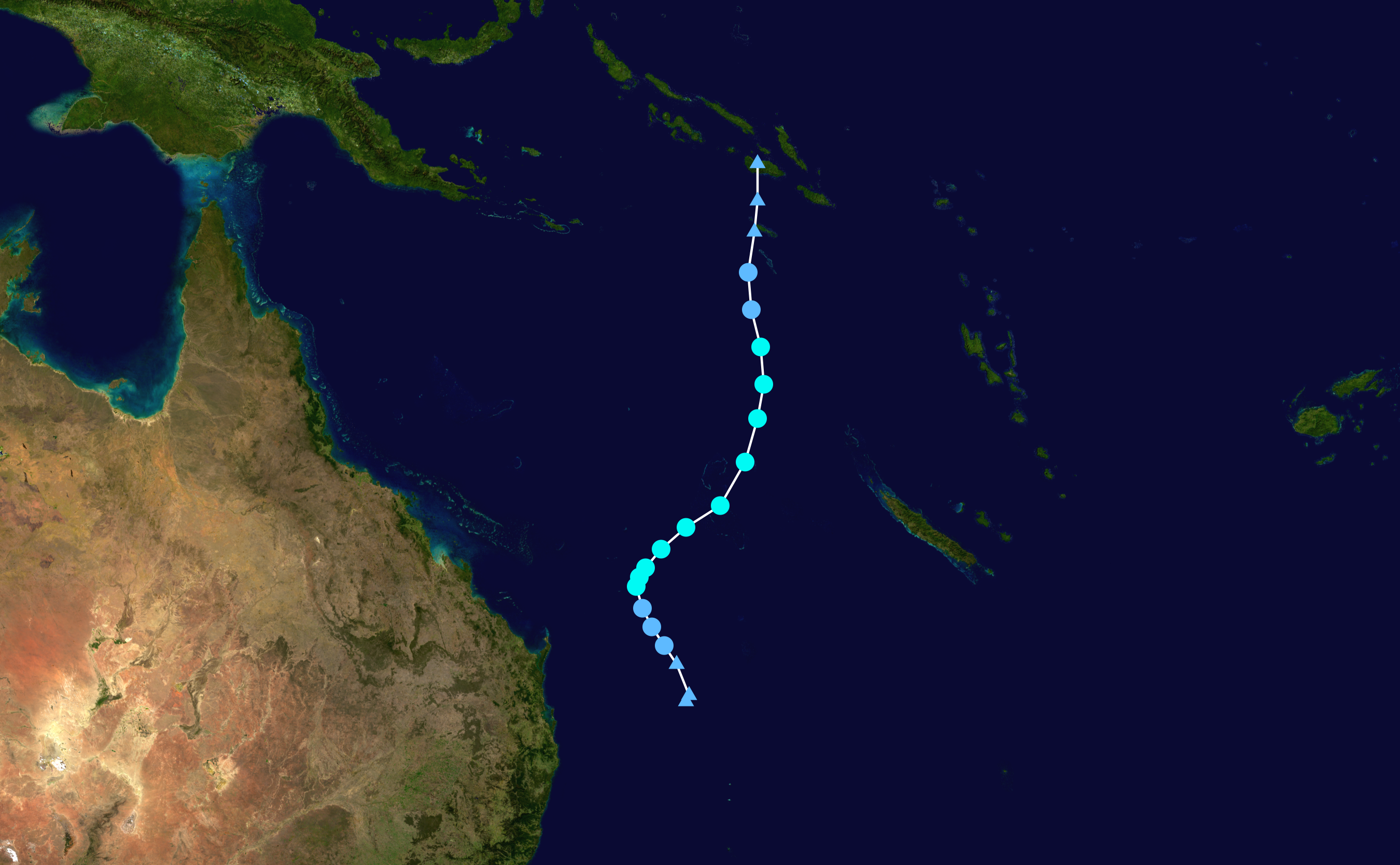
- Duration: March 11 – March 13 (Exited basin)
- Peak intensity: 55 km/h (35 mph) (10-min); 998 hPa (mbar)

On March 11, the FMS reported that Tropical Disturbance 10F, had developed about 85 km (55 mi) to the southwest of Rennell and Bellona Province of the Solomon Islands. The system was poorly organised with deep atmospheric convection, displaced to the east of the system's consolidating low-level circulation center. The disturbance was subsequently classified as Tropical Low 21U by the BoM during March 12, as it moved southwards within an area of low vertical wind shear and warm sea surface temperatures. The JTWC initiated advisories on the system later that day and classified the storm as Tropical Cyclone 13P, after the system had rapidly consolidated, with bands of atmospheric convection wrapping into the low-level circulation center.

=== Tropical Cyclone Iris ===
- Category 1 tropical cyclone (Australian scale)
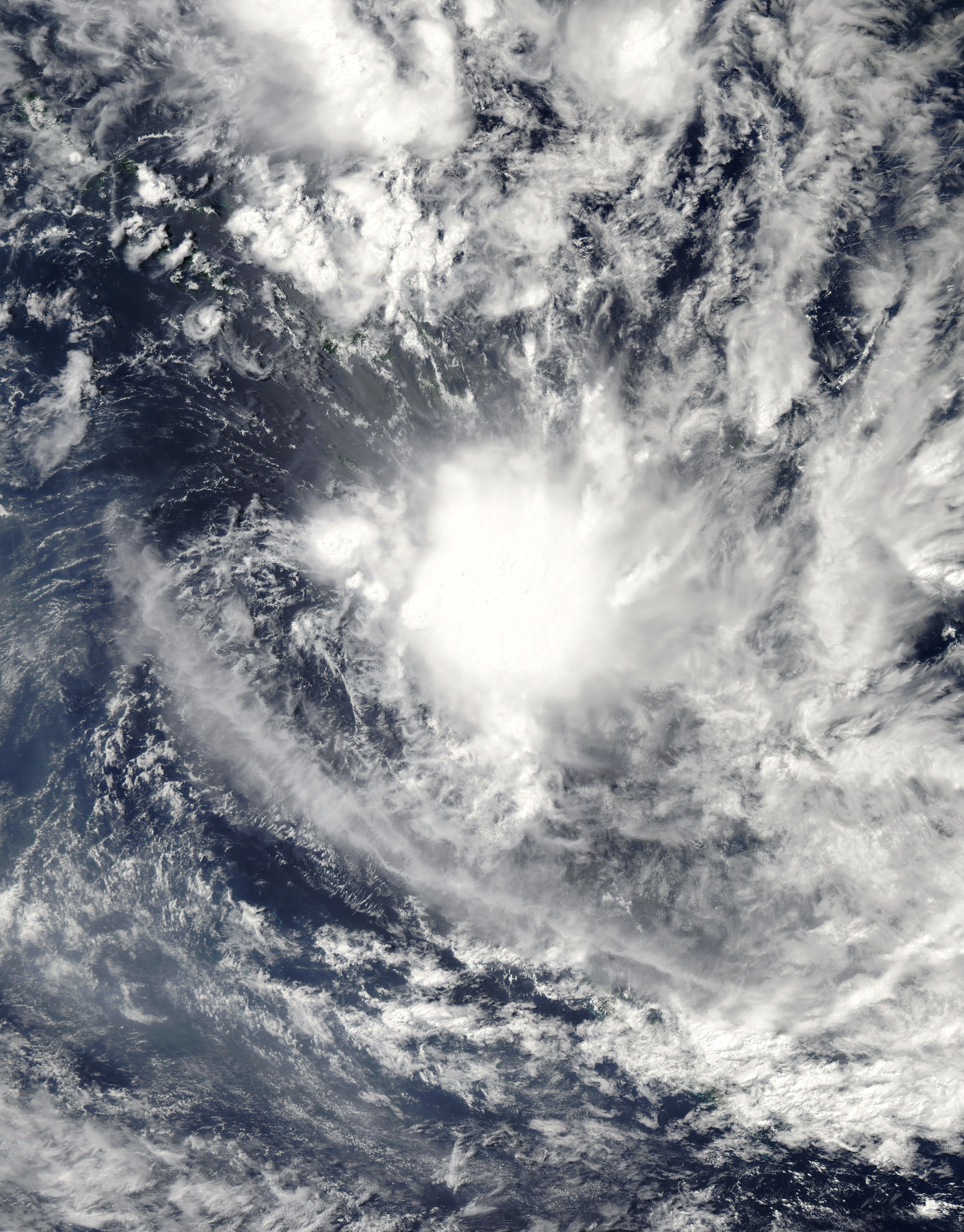
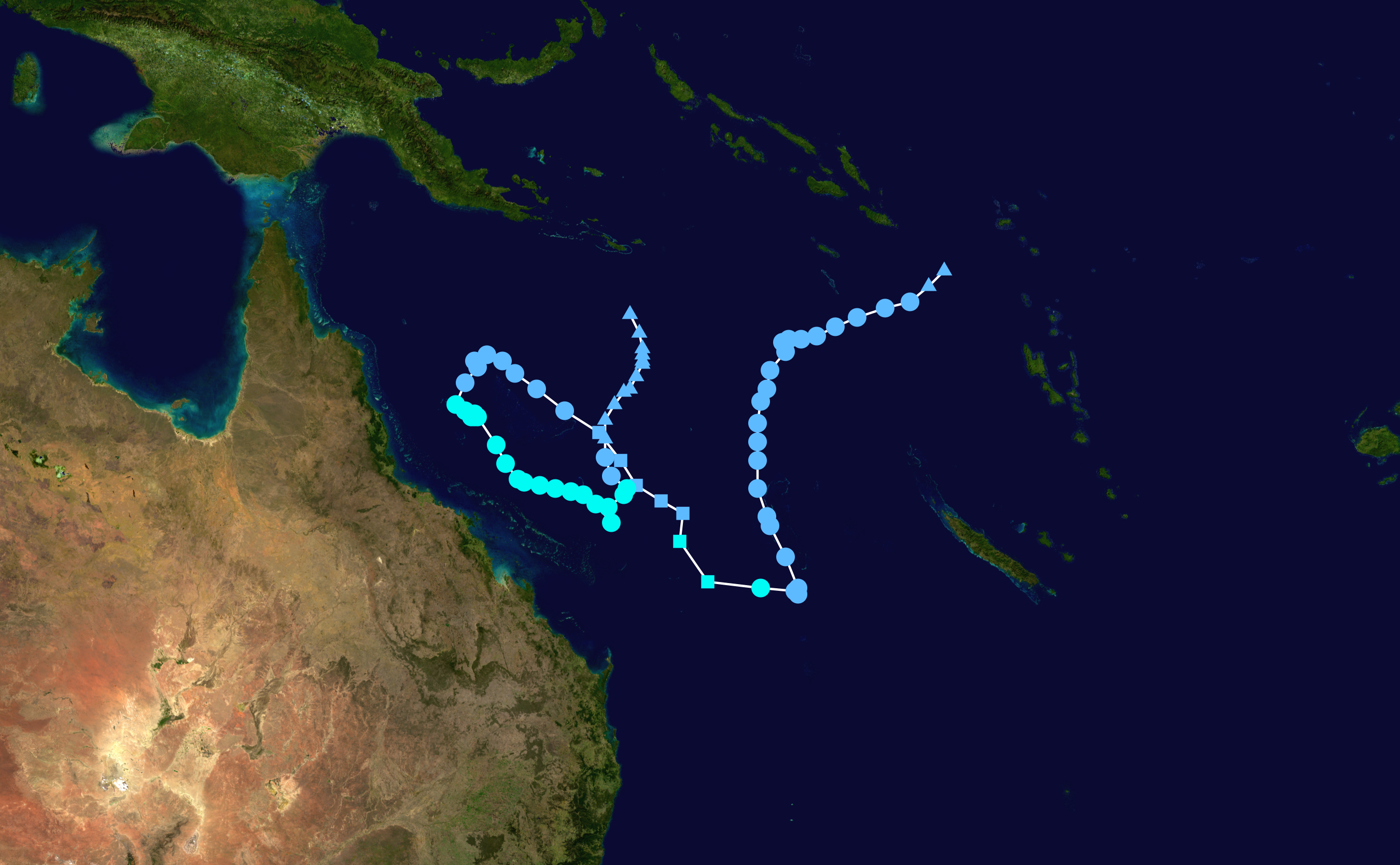
- Duration: March 20 – March 24 (Exited basin)
- Peak intensity: 75 km/h (45 mph) (10-min); 993 hPa (mbar)

During March 20, the FMS reported that Tropical Disturbance 11F had developed within an area of low to moderate vertical wind shear, over the eastern Solomon Islands around 200 km (125 mi) to the east of Honiara. At this time the system was poorly organised with deep atmospheric convection, located to the east of the low-level circulation centre. Over the next few days, the system remained weak as it moved erratically around the Solomon Islands and was classified as a tropical depression during March 22.

On March 24, Tropical Depression 11F strengthened into Tropical Cyclone Iris. Later on the same day, Iris exited the basin and entered the Australian region basin.

=== Tropical Cyclone Josie ===
- Category 1 tropical cyclone (Australian scale)
- Tropical storm (SSHWS)
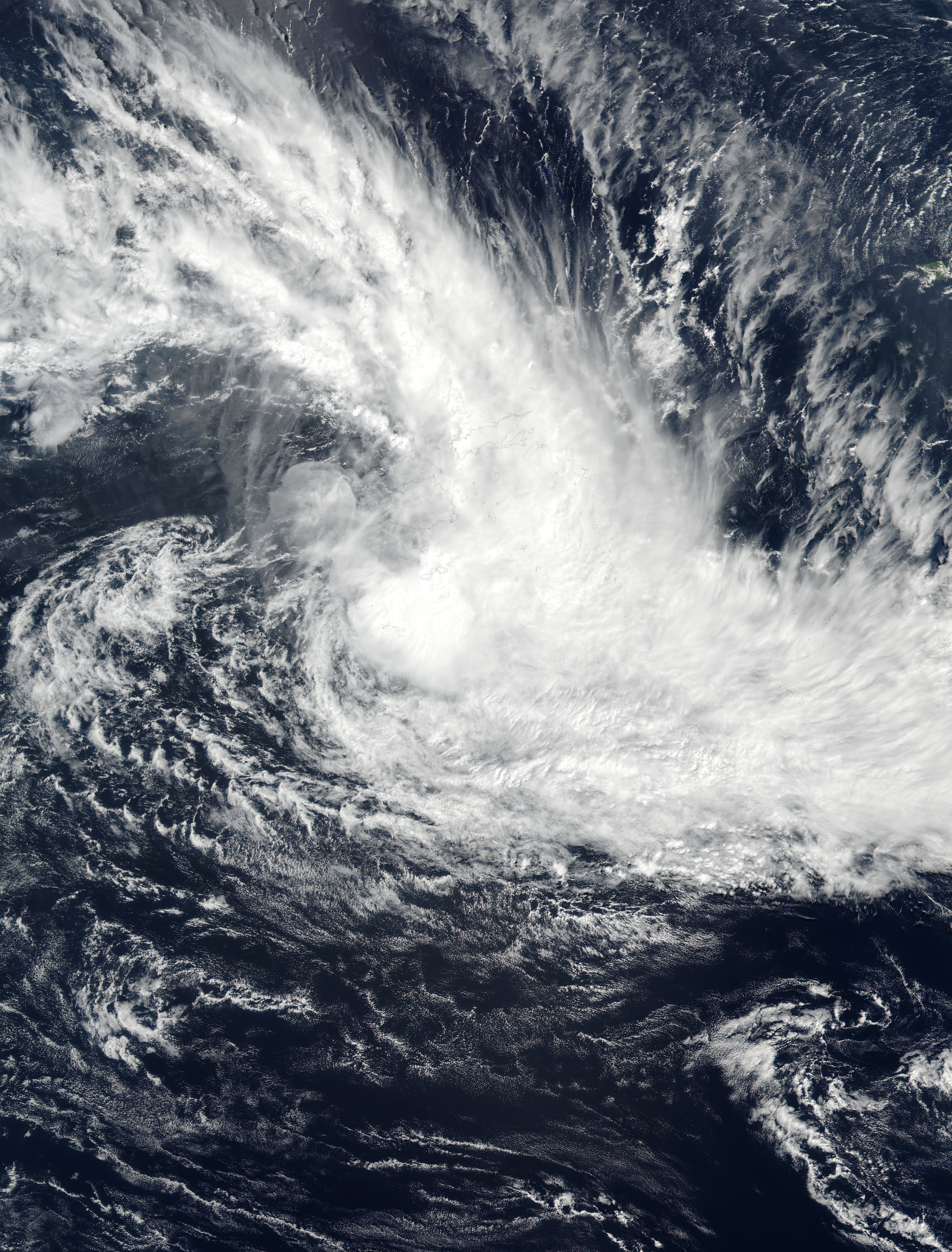
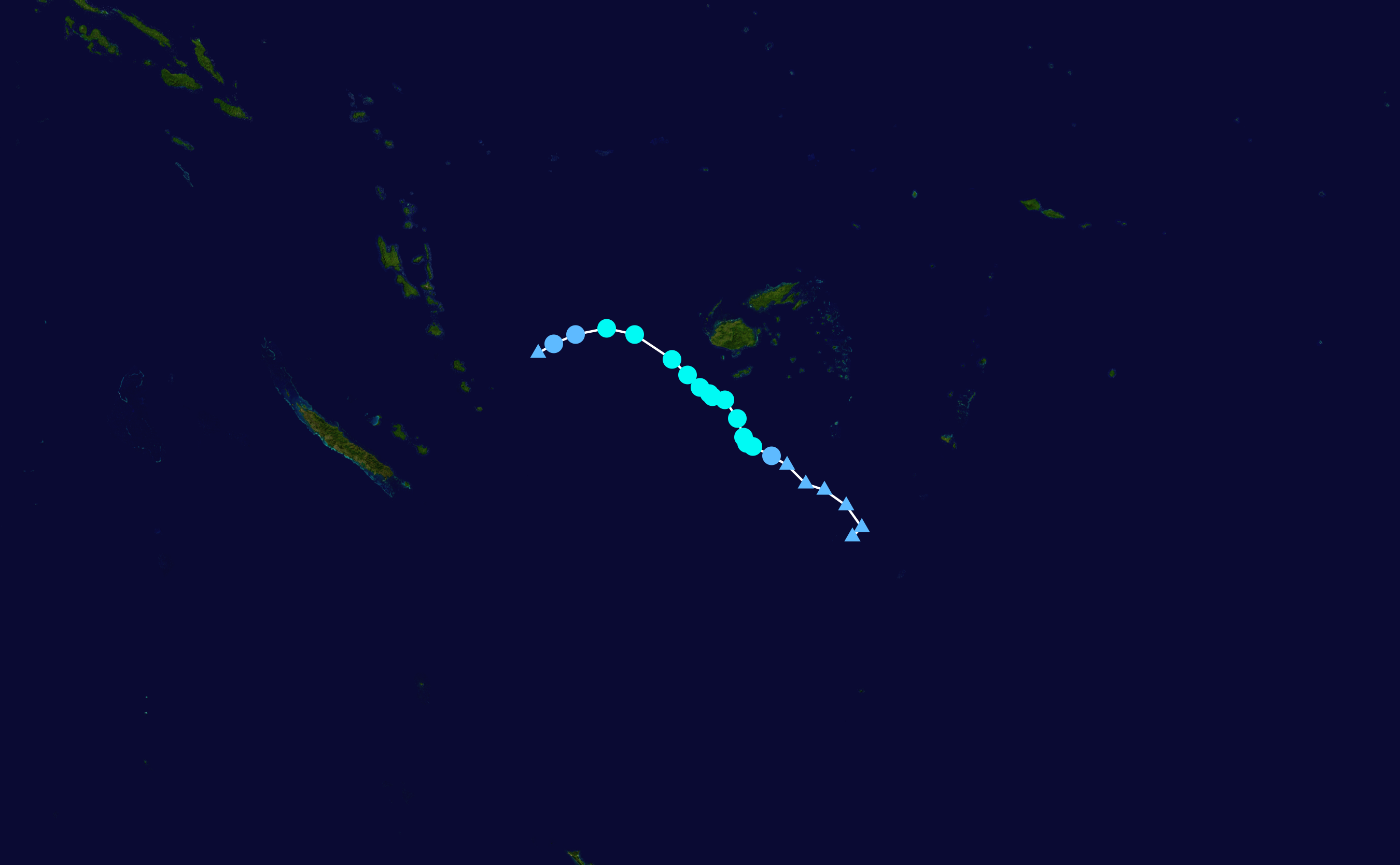
- Duration: March 29 – April 2
- Peak intensity: 75 km/h (45 mph) (10-min); 993 hPa (mbar)

During March 29, the Fiji Meteorological Service reported that Tropical Disturbance 12F had developed about 350 km (215 mi) to the east of Port Vila in Vanuatu. At this stage, the system was poorly organised with atmospheric convection surrounding the system displaced to the northeast of the disturbance's weak low-level circulation. However, the disturbance was located to the south of a ridge of high pressure, and within a favourable environment for further development, with low to moderate levels of vertical wind shear and warm sea surface temperatures of around 28–30 °C (82–86 °F). By 23:20 UTC that day, the system had strengthened into Tropical Depression 12F. Despite moderate shear, the system organized further into Tropical Cyclone Josie by March 31.

Despite not making landfall, Cyclone Josie caused heavy rainfall and sustained gale-force winds in southern Fiji. Because of these effects, Josie caused upwards of $10 million in damages. Severe flooding occurred in the city of Nadi. Altogether, Josie left six people dead. Five people were washed away by floodwaters, of which four are confirmed dead and one is still missing.

=== Severe Tropical Cyclone Keni ===
- Category 3 severe tropical cyclone (Australian scale)
- Category 2 tropical cyclone (SSHWS)
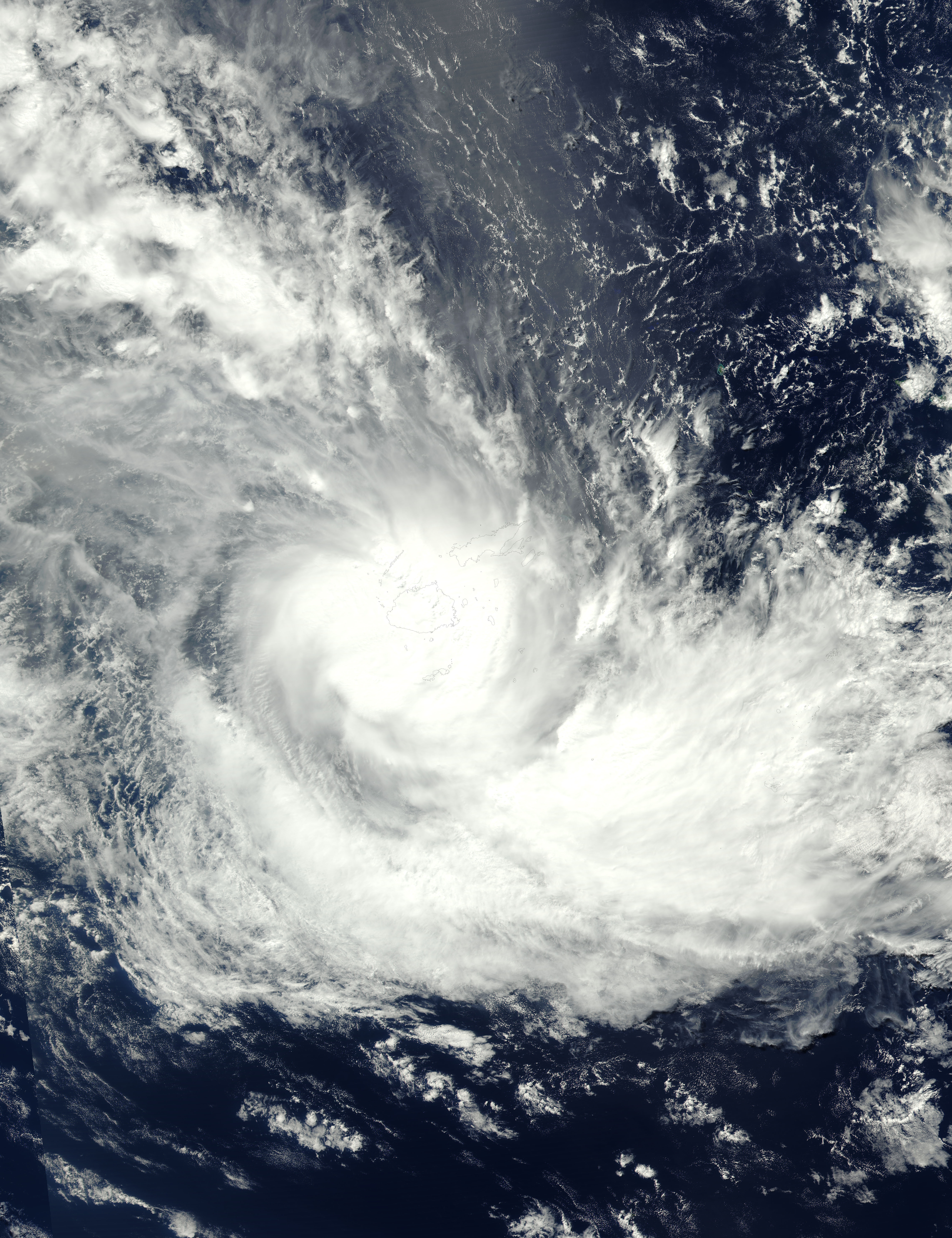
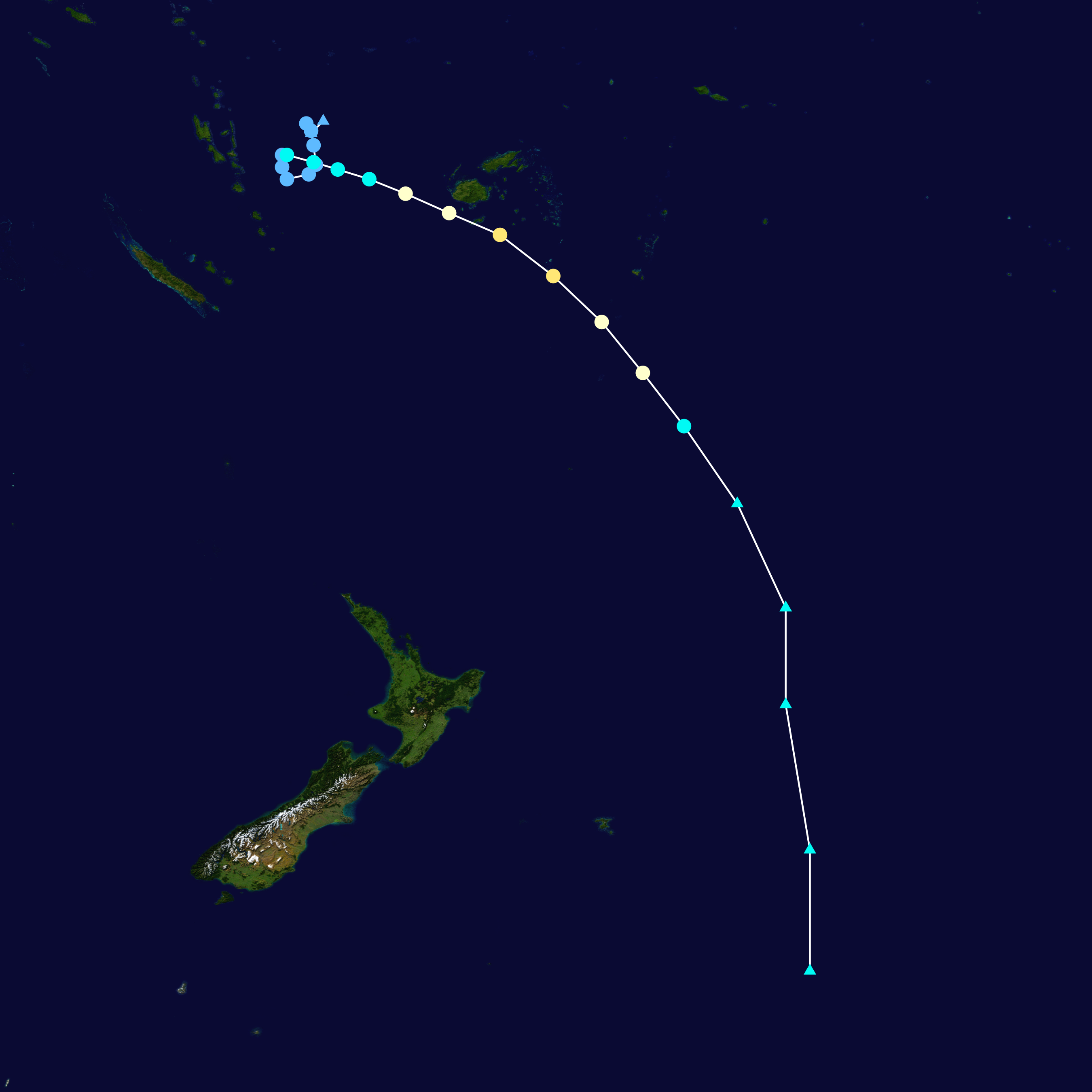
- Duration: April 5 – April 11
- Peak intensity: 155 km/h (100 mph) (10-min); 960 hPa (mbar)

Tropical Cyclone Keni impacted Fiji and caused the cast and crew of the 37th season of the American reality competition series, Survivor, to be temporarily evacuated to the production's base camp.

=== Tropical Depression 14F ===
- Tropical depression (Australian scale)
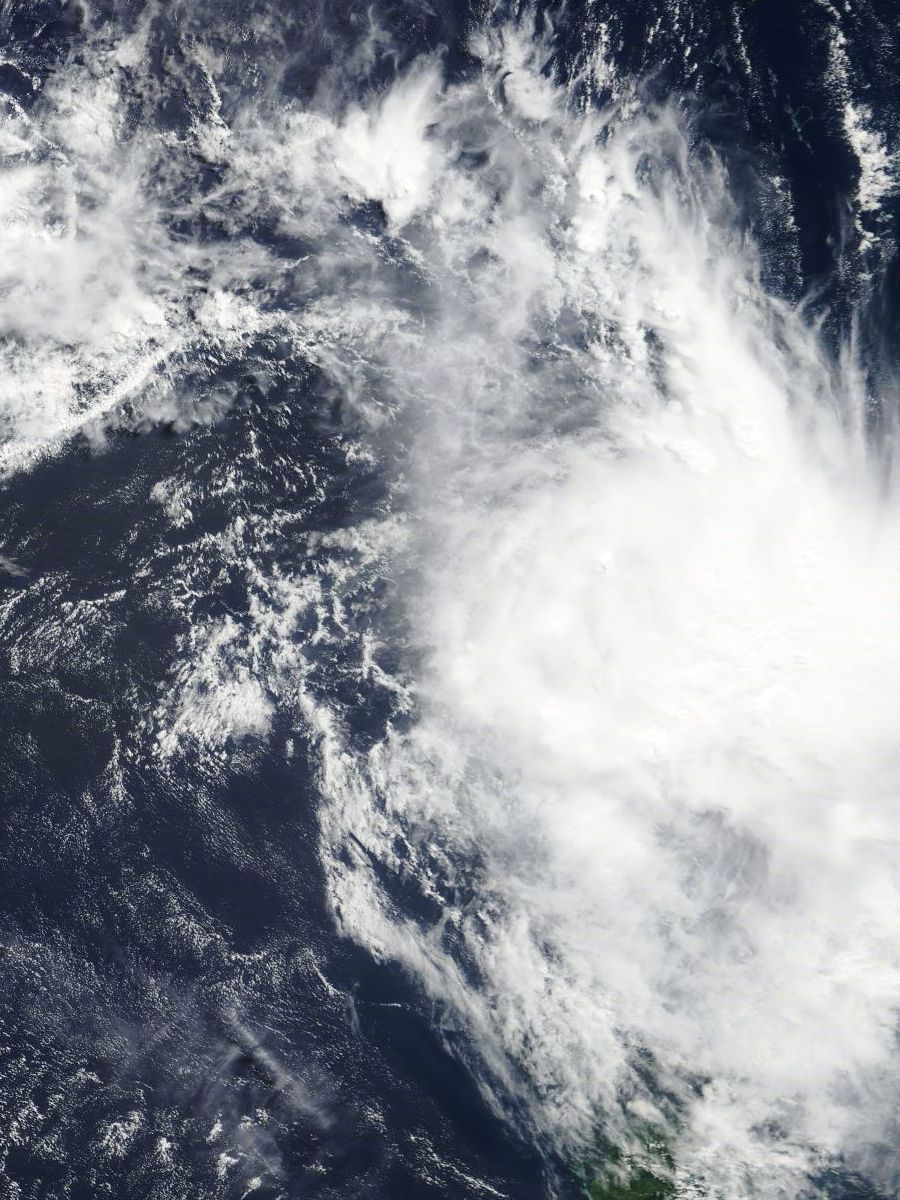
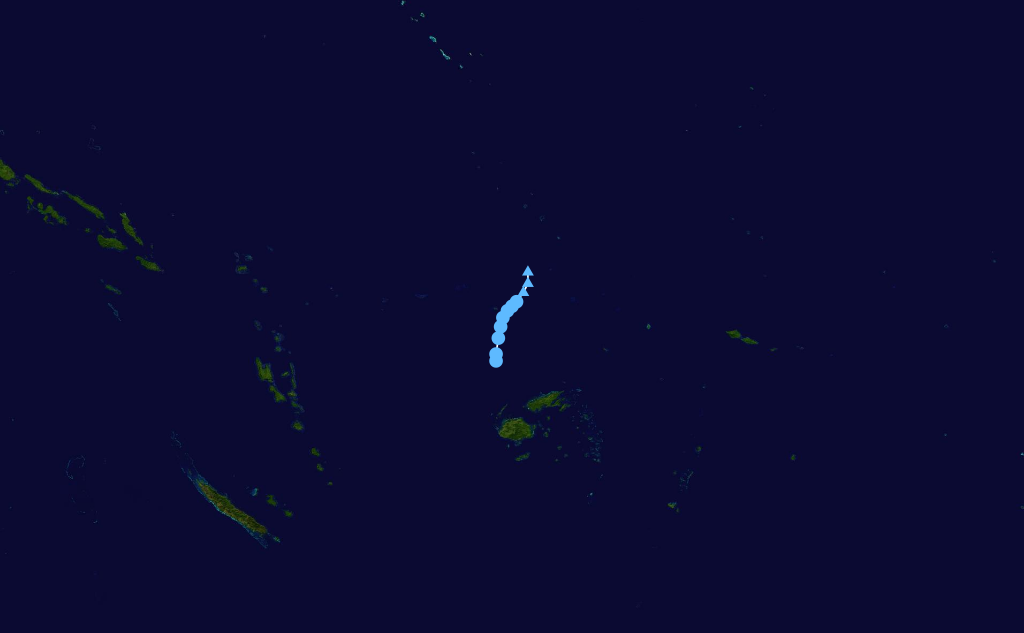
- Duration: April 17 – April 20
- Peak intensity: Winds not specified; 1000 hPa (mbar)

=== Other systems ===
During December 16, Tropical Disturbance 02F developed within a trough of low pressure, about 25 km (15 mi) to the northeast of the island of Futuna. During the following day, Tropical Disturbance 03F developed along the same trough of low pressure about 45 km (30 mi) to the southeast of the island of Wallis. Over the next couple of days, the disturbances moved southeastwards into areas of high vertical wind shear, before they were last noted during December 18 and 19 as they dissipated to the southeast of Samoa.

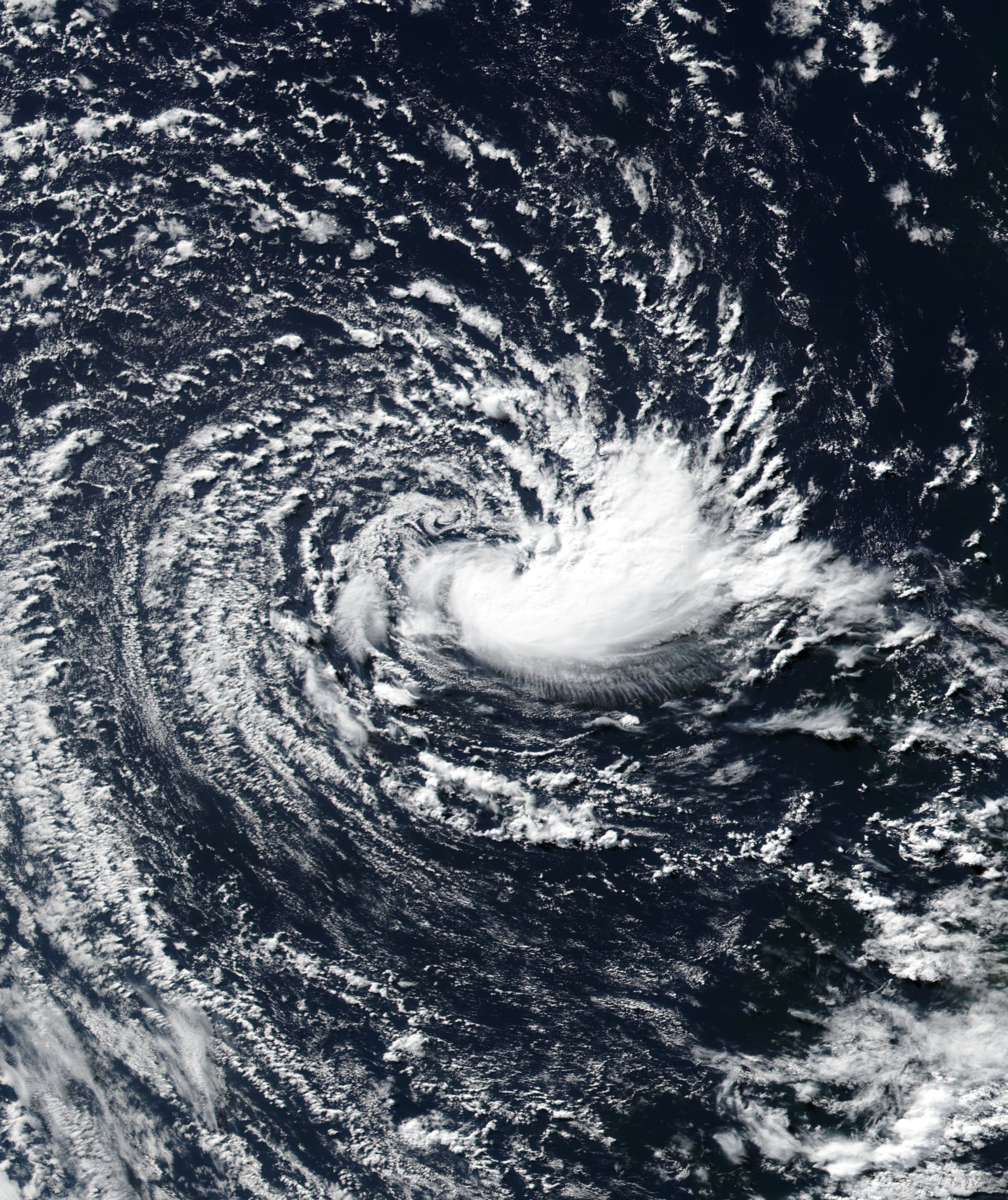
Subtropical Cyclone "Lexi" near Chile on May 7

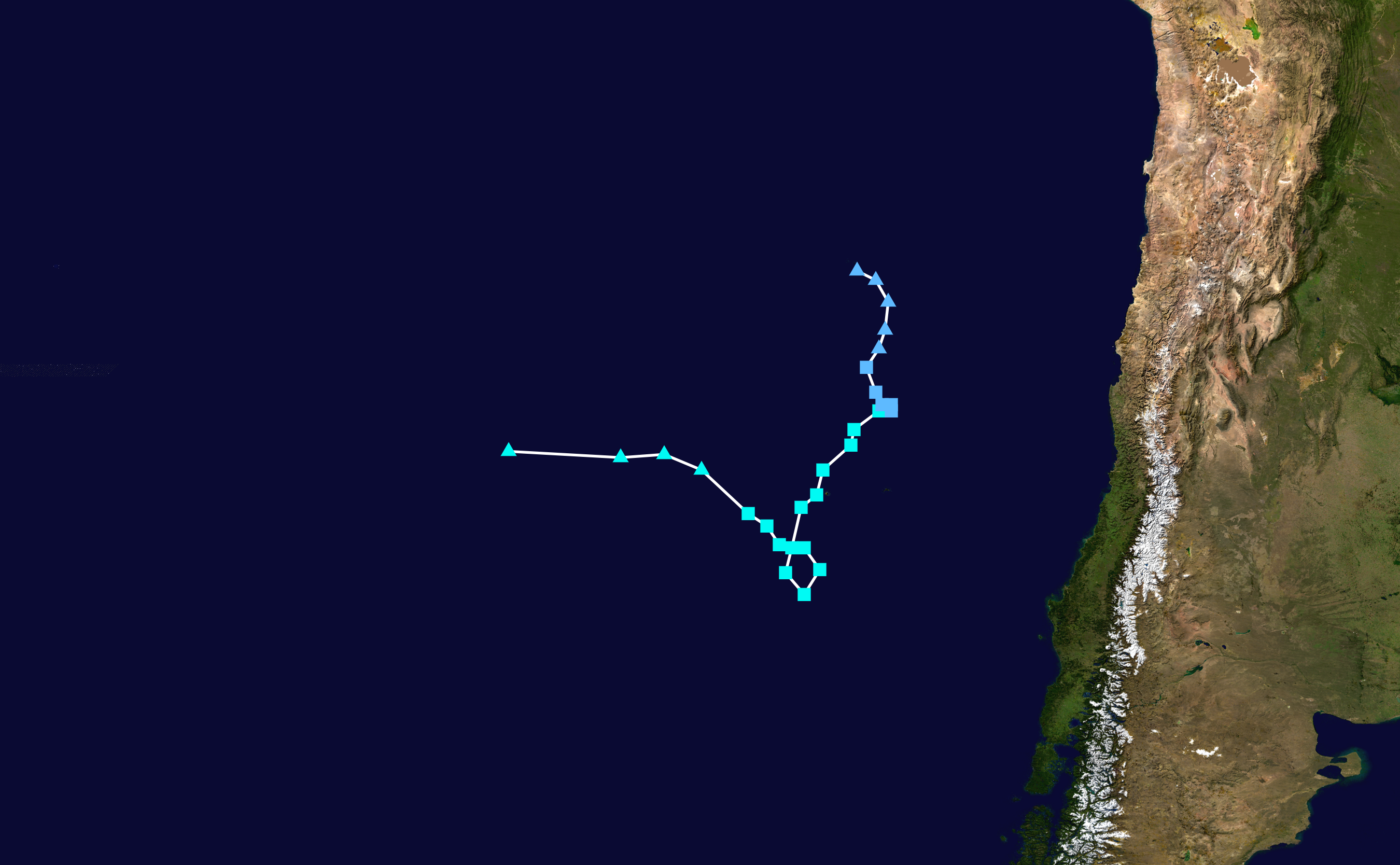
Track of Subtropical Cyclone "Lexi"

On May 4, 2018, a system identified as a subtropical cyclone formed east of 120°W, near 80°W, just a few hundred miles off the coast of Chile, with researchers unofficially naming the storm Lexi. The cyclone formed in an area without a Regional Specialized Meteorological Center, so it was not officially classified. On May 9, the satellite services division of the NOAA classified the system as a weak subtropical storm, despite occurring in cooler (below 20 °C) sea surface temperatures.

== Storm names ==
Within the Southern Pacific a tropical depression is judged to have reached tropical cyclone intensity should it reach winds of 65 km/h (40 mph) and it is evident that gales are occurring at least halfway around the center. Tropical depressions that intensify into a tropical cyclone between the Equator and 25°S and between 160°E and 120°W are named by the FMS. However, should a tropical depression intensify to the south of 25°S between 160°E and 120°W it will be named by MetService in conjunction with the FMS. If a tropical cyclone moves out of the basin and into the Australian region, it will retain its original name. The names Fehi, Hola, Josie and Keni would be used for the first time this year (and only, in the case of Keni), after replacing the names Frank, Hali, Jo, and Kim after the 1998-99 and 1999-2000 seasons respectively. The names that were used for the 2017-18 season are listed below:

- Fehi
- Gita
- Hola
- Iris
- Josie
- Keni

If a tropical cyclone enters the South Pacific basin from the Australian region basin (west of 160°E), it will retain the name assigned to it by the Australian Bureau of Meteorology. The following storms were named in this manner:

- Linda

Also of note, the name Lexi was assigned to the above mentioned storm, however it is not part of any defined naming list and thus is unofficial.

=== Retirement ===
After the season, the names Gita, Josie, and Keni were all retired, and replaced with Garth, Jo, and Kala respectively.

== Season effects ==
This table lists all the storms that developed in the South Pacific to the east of longitude 160°E during the 2017–18 season. It includes their intensity on the Australian tropical cyclone intensity scale, duration, name, landfalls, deaths, and damages. All data is taken from RSMC Nadi and/or TCWC Wellington, and all of the damage figures are in 2017 USD.

Name	Dates	Peak intensity			Areas affected	Damage (USD)	Deaths	Ref(s).
Name	Dates	Category	Wind speed	Pressure	Areas affected	Damage (USD)	Deaths	Ref(s).
02F	December 16 – 18	Tropical disturbance	Not specified	1003 hPa (29.62 inHg)	None	None	None	
03F	December 17 – 19	Tropical disturbance	Not specified	1000 hPa (29.53 inHg)	None	None	None	
04F	December 20 – 26	Tropical depression	55 km/h (35 mph)	998 hPa (29.47 inHg)	Fiji	None	None	
05F	January 26 – 27	Tropical disturbance	Not specified	996 hPa (29.41 inHg)	New Caledonia	None	None	
Fehi	January 28 – 30	Category 1 tropical cyclone	85 km/h (55 mph)	986 hPa (29.12 inHg)	New Caledonia, New Zealand	$67 million	None	
Gita	February 3 – 19	Category 5 severe tropical cyclone	205 km/h (125 mph)	927 hPa (27.37 inHg)	Fiji, Wallis and Futuna, Samoan Islands, Niue, Tonga, New Caledonia, New Zealand	$250 million	2	
08F	February 3 – 11	Tropical depression	Not specified	994 hPa (29.35 inHg)	Fiji	None	None	
Hola	March 3 – 11	Category 4 severe tropical cyclone	165 km/h (105 mph)	952 hPa (28.11 inHg)	Vanuatu, New Caledonia, New Zealand	Unknown	3	
Linda	March 11 – 13	Tropical depression	35 kn (65 km/h; 40 mph)	995 hPa (29.38 inHg)	None	None	None	
Iris	March 20 – 24	Category 1 tropical cyclone	75 km/h (45 mph)	993 hPa (29.32 inHg)	Solomon Islands	None	None	
Josie	March 29 – April 2	Category 1 tropical cyclone	75 km/h (45 mph)	993 hPa (29.32 inHg)	Vanuatu, Fiji, Tonga	$10 million	6	
Keni	April 5 – 11	Category 3 severe tropical cyclone	140 km/h (85 mph)	970 hPa (28.64 inHg)	Vanuatu, Fiji, Tonga	$50 million	None	
14F	April 17 – 20	Tropical depression	Not specified	1000 hPa (29.53 inHg)	Rotuma	Unknown	Unknown	
Season aggregates
13 systems	December 16, 2017 – April 20, 2018		205 km/h (125 mph)	927 hPa (27.37 inHg)		$377 million	11	

== See also ==
- Weather of 2017 and 2018
- Tropical cyclones in 2017 and 2018
- List of Southern Hemisphere tropical cyclone seasons
- Atlantic hurricane seasons: 2017, 2018
- Pacific hurricane seasons: 2017, 2018
- Pacific typhoon seasons: 2017, 2018
- North Indian Ocean cyclone seasons: 2017, 2018
- 2017–18 South-West Indian Ocean cyclone season
- 2017–18 Australian region cyclone season
