= Tropical Depression Josie =

Pacific tropical depression in 2018

Tropical Depression 13W (Josie)
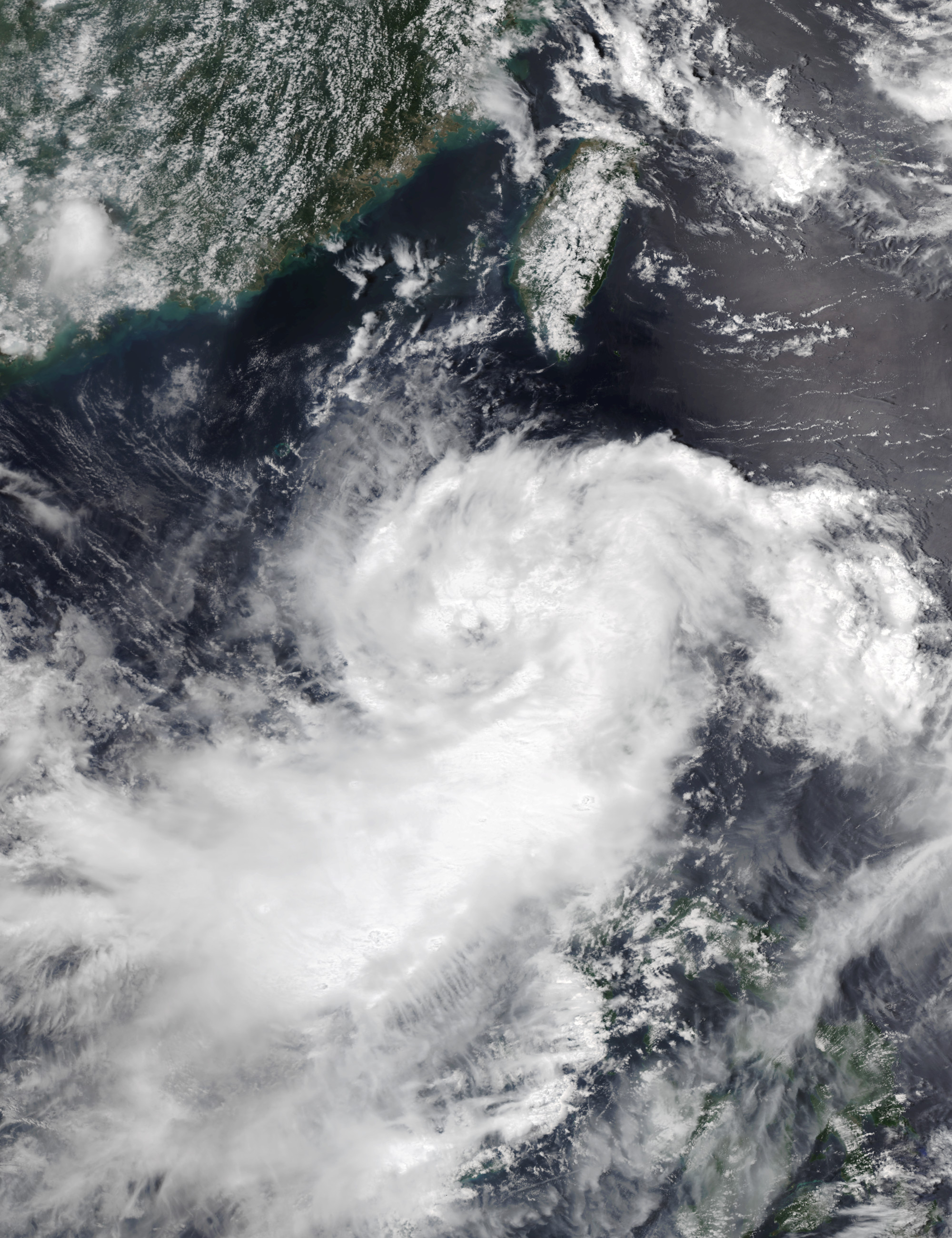
- 13W impacting Luzon on July 21

Meteorological history
- Formed: July 20, 2018
- Dissipated: July 23, 2018

Tropical depression
- 10-minute sustained (JMA)
- Highest winds: 55 km/h (35 mph)
- Lowest pressure: 996 hPa (mbar); 29.41 inHg

Tropical storm
- 1-minute sustained (SSHWS/JTWC)
- Highest winds: 65 km/h (40 mph)
- Lowest pressure: 995 hPa (mbar); 29.38 inHg

Overall effects
- Fatalities: 16 total
- Damage: $87.4 million (2018 USD)
- Areas affected: Philippines, Taiwan
- IBTrACS
- Part of the 2018 Pacific typhoon season

Tropical Depression Josie was a weak tropical system that impacted the Philippine archipelago of Luzon in late July 2018, bringing widespread flooding. The tropical depression was classified in the South China Sea on July 20, and steadily moved eastward while gradually intensifying. The storm reached its peak intensity of 1-minute sustained winds of 65 km/h (40 mph) while nearing the northern tip of the Ilocos Region. By July 22, the system moved northward and rapidly weakened. The system was last noted on July 23 to the northeast of Taiwan.

While a relatively weak system, Josie was known for actively enhancing the southwest monsoon in Luzon, which was already prevailing since the passages of Son-tinh and Ampil just a few days prior. The monsoon rains, along with Josie, resulted in ₱4.66 billion (US$87.4 million) worth of damages in the country, while also killing a total of 16 people. Despite the high economic toll, the name Josie was not retired from the local naming list.

== Meteorological history ==
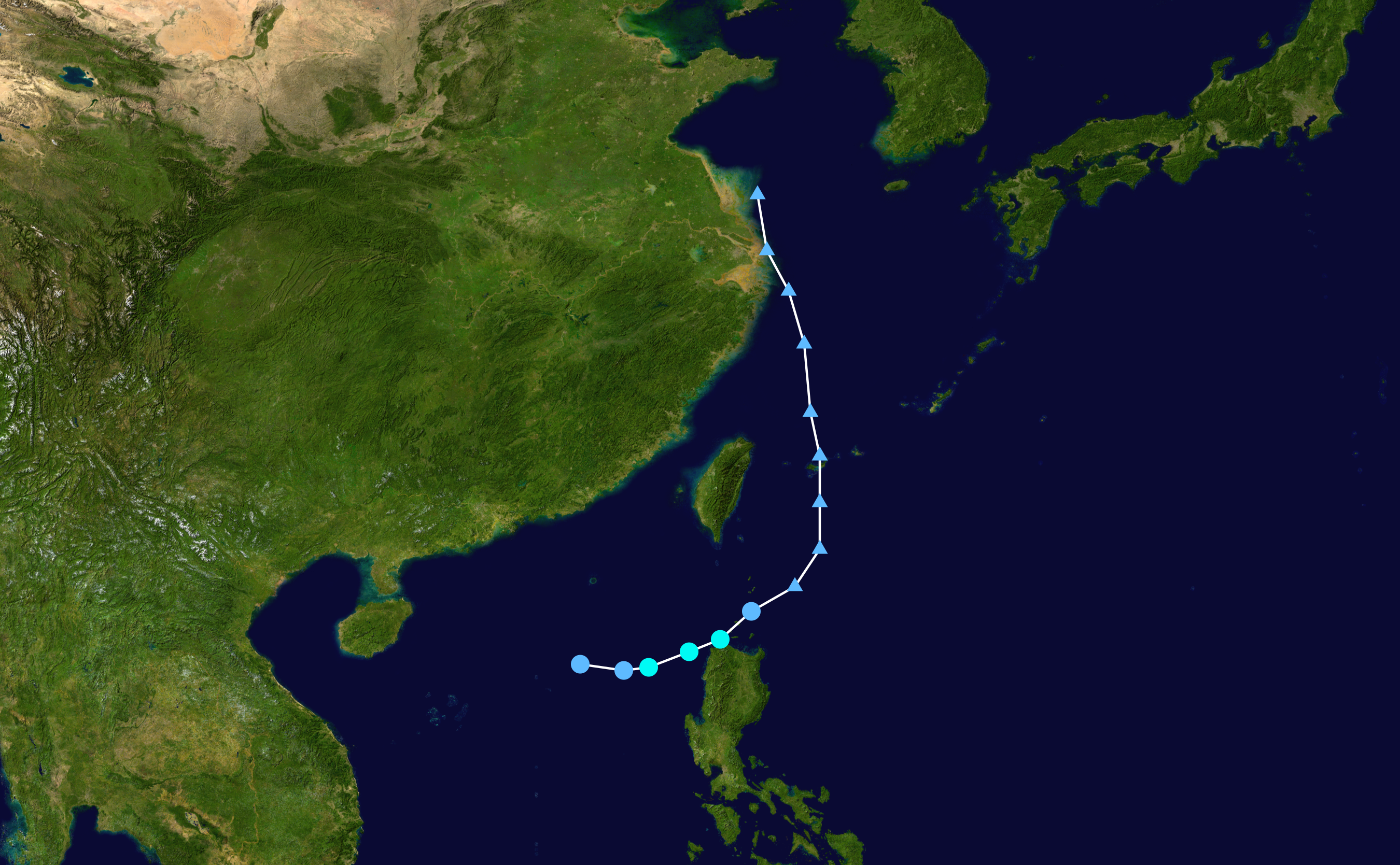
Map plotting the storm's track and intensity, according to the Saffir–Simpson scale Map key Saffir–Simpson scale Tropical depression (≤38 mph, ≤62 km/h) Tropical storm (39–73 mph, 63–118 km/h) Category 1 (74–95 mph, 119–153 km/h) Category 2 (96–110 mph, 154–177 km/h) Category 3 (111–129 mph, 178–208 km/h) Category 4 (130–156 mph, 209–251 km/h) Category 5 (≥157 mph, ≥252 km/h) Unknown Storm type Tropical cyclone Subtropical cyclone Extratropical cyclone, remnant low, tropical disturbance, or monsoon depression

On 06:00 UTC of July 20, the Joint Typhoon Warning Center (JTWC) began tracking a tropical disturbance that had developed about 402 km (250 mi) south-south east of Hong Kong. Operationally, the Japan Meteorological Agency (JMA) classified the system as a weak tropical depression around that same time, however, post-analysis showed that the system strengthened into a weak tropical depression six hours later. Later that day, the JTWC issued a Tropical Cyclone Formation Alert after the system gradually organised. Animated enhanced infrared satellite imagery showed that the system had flaring convection wrapping into its Low-level circulation center. The storm's location over favourable environments with low wind shear and warm sea-surface temperatures prompted the JTWC to upgrade the system to a tropical depression and initiate advisories, receiving the designation of 13W. On 00:00 UTC of July 21, the JMA began issuing advisories on the tropical depression, meaning that the system is expected to strengthen to a tropical storm within the next 24 hours. Three hours later, the PAGASA began issuing advisories on the tropical depression, giving the local name Josie.

Around the time the Philippine Atmospheric, Geophysical and Astronomical Services Administration (PAGASA) started tracking the storm, Josie was located in an area of low vertical wind shear of 5-10 knots. This helped organise the storm more as a "compact system" with deep convection, despite remaining at tropical depression intensity. However, in a post-analysis report after the season, the JTWC classified Josie as a tropical storm with 1-minute sustained winds of 65 km/h (40 mph). The JMA only remained the system as a tropical depression with a minimum barometric pressure of 996 hPa (29.41 inHg). As Josie neared the northern tip of Luzon, vertical wind shear gradually increased, maintaining the storm's intensity. By 09:00 UTC of July 22, Josie curved northward, and animated satellite imagery showed the storm's structure began to deteriorate. The storm's center became really disorganised. Twelve hours later, the JMA issued its final advisory on Josie, meaning that the JMA no longer expects the system to intensify into a named tropical storm. By the next day, the storm's center became exposed with its last remaining convection being sheared. Hence, the JMA fully stopped tracking the system on 12:00 UTC of July 23. The JTWC issued their final advisory on the system three hours later.

== Preparations and impact ==
On July 21, as soon as PAGASA began tracking Tropical Depression Josie, Tropical Cyclone Warning Signal (TCWS) #1 was issued for the Ilocos Region (Region I), northern Cagayan and the Babuyan Islands. This also meant that local government officials within the area banned sea travel in the eastern seaboards of Luzon, and advised residents to take appropriate actions against flooding and landslides. At that time, the PAGASA warned that light to moderate rainfall was expected in most of Central Luzon, the rest of Mountain Province and the province of Pangasinan, while majority of the country will experience light rainfall with scattered thunderstorms within the next 12 hours. They also warned that all residents residing near creeks, rivers and channels must evacuate, and hence, all bridges and roads were closed in Northern Luzon and in the Cordilleras. The PAGASA later issued a yellow rainfall warning for Batangas, which meant that flooding was possible with a continuous intense rainfall of about 15–30 mm (0.6–1.2 in) being observed in an hour. On 5:00 pm local time (09:00 UTC) of the same day, the National Disaster Risk Reduction and Management Council (NDRRMC) issued a "red alert" to all member and government agencies towards the areas that are affected, mainly in the northern provinces. This red alert means that all member agencies must take action towards immediate help from affected families from torrential rains.

Later that day, Pangasinan was under a state of calamity due to widespread flooding, where 1,291 families (or 5,067 individuals) have been temporarily evacuated. In Calatagan, Batangas, a boat got capsized due to rough seas spawned by the enhancement of the monsoon and rescued the 57 passengers and 10 crew members safely. More than 250,000 houses were affected in seven different regions, where a total of 14,551 families (61,674 individuals) were escorted to 302 evacuation centres.

== See also ==
- Weather of 2018
- Tropical cyclones in 2018
- Tropical Storm Halong (2008)
- Typhoon Ketsana (2009)
- Tropical Storm Trami (2013)
