= Typhoon Ewiniar (2024) =

Pacific typhoon in 2024

Typhoon Ewiniar (Aghon)
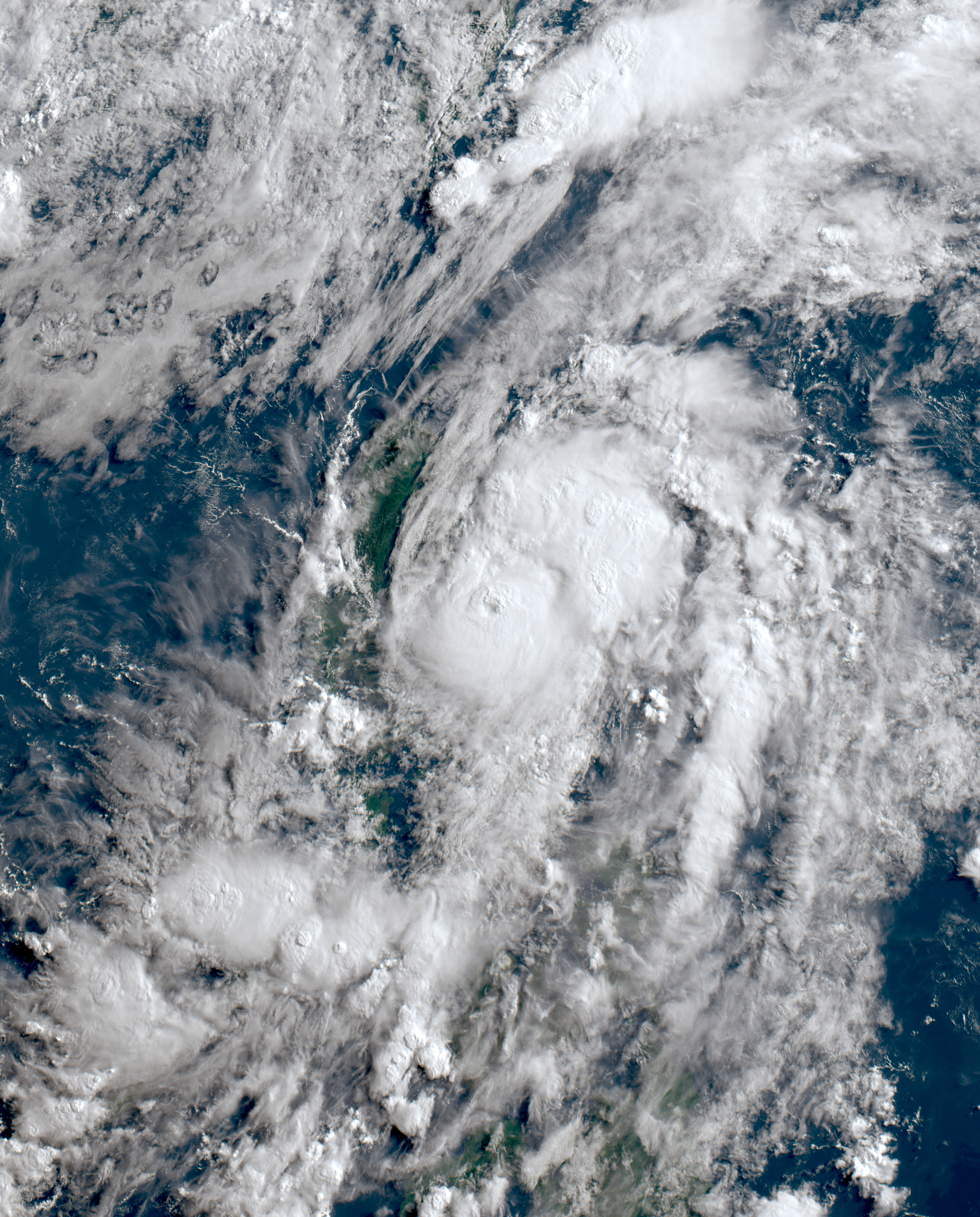
- Ewiniar near peak intensity just east of Luzon late on May 26

Meteorological history
- Formed: May 23, 2024
- Extratropical: May 30, 2024
- Dissipated: June 6, 2024

Typhoon
- 10-minute sustained (JMA)
- Highest winds: 140 km/h (85 mph)
- Lowest pressure: 970 hPa (mbar); 28.64 inHg

Category 2-equivalent typhoon
- 1-minute sustained (SSHWS/JTWC)
- Highest winds: 165 km/h (105 mph)
- Lowest pressure: 961 hPa (mbar); 28.38 inHg

Overall effects
- Fatalities: 6
- Injuries: 8
- Damage: $17.7 million (2024 USD)
- Areas affected: Philippines, Japan, Alaska
- IBTrACS
- Part of the 2024 Pacific typhoon season

Typhoon Ewiniar, (Note: The name Ewiniar (Chuukese: Éwúniyár, [əwɨnijar]) was contributed by the Federated States of Micronesia and refers to a storm god in Chuukese.) known in the Philippines as Typhoon Aghon, was a fairly strong tropical cyclone that impacted parts of the Philippines, particularly Luzon, in late May 2024. The first named storm and typhoon of the 2024 Pacific typhoon season, Ewiniar emerged from an area of atmospheric convection 441 km (274 mi) southeast of Palau. The Japan Meteorological Agency (JMA) labeled the system as a low-pressure area on May 21 just southeast of Palau.

It intensified on May 23 and became a tropical depression, giving it the name Aghon by the Philippine Atmospheric, Geophysical, and Astronomical Services Administration after entering the Philippine Area of Responsibility, marking it as the fifth-latest start of a Pacific typhoon season since reliable records began; the depression intensified into a tropical storm, assigning it the name Ewiniar. The cyclone made nine landfalls in the Philippines. Afterward, it began to move over the warm tropical waters of Lamon Bay, where the Joint Typhoon Warning Center and the JMA upgraded Ewiniar into a minimal typhoon. Beginning to weaken for the final time on May 30, the storm passed directly over the island of Minamidaitōjima and began an extratropical transition. It was last noted by the JMA early on June 2, near the International Date Line, and absorbed into another extratropical cyclone just south of Prince William Sound on June 6.

Strong winds and flooding caused power outages and transportation disruptions, with rough seas stranding over 7,175 people in various ports, and more than 152,266 people were directly impacted. In Japan, heavy rainfall was observed in several regions, with a maximum of 52.5 mm (2.07 in) of rain being recorded in Miyake, Tokyo. Agricultural damage in the Philippines totaled ₱85.6 million (US$1.47 million). Damage to infrastructure was valued at ₱943 million (US$16.2 million). In all, the typhoon killed at least six people and left eight injured, resulting in over ₱1 billion (US$17.7 million) in damages.

== Meteorological history ==
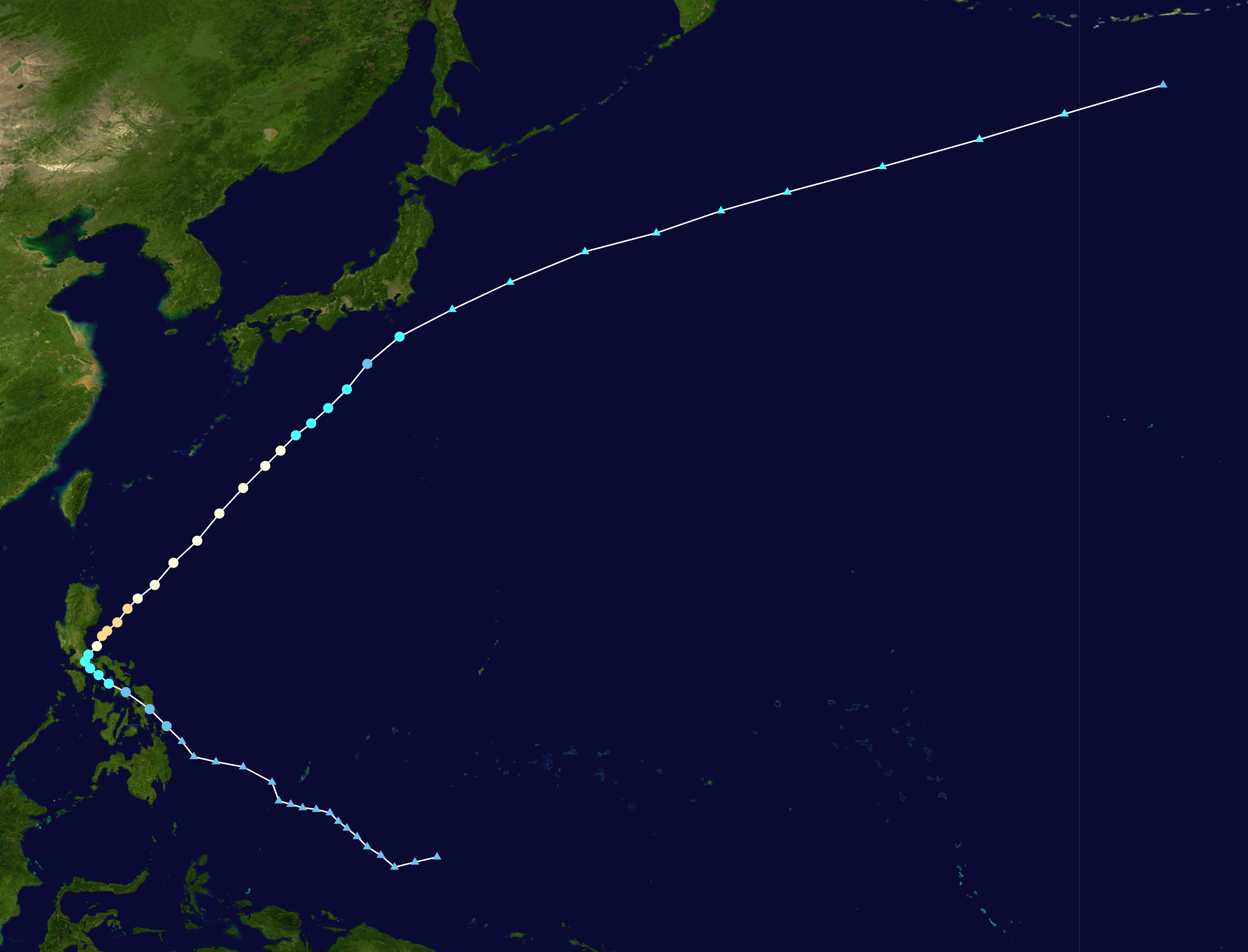
Map plotting the storm's track and intensity, according to the Saffir–Simpson scale Map key Saffir–Simpson scale Tropical depression (≤38 mph, ≤62 km/h) Tropical storm (39–73 mph, 63–118 km/h) Category 1 (74–95 mph, 119–153 km/h) Category 2 (96–110 mph, 154–177 km/h) Category 3 (111–129 mph, 178–208 km/h) Category 4 (130–156 mph, 209–251 km/h) Category 5 (≥157 mph, ≥252 km/h) Unknown Storm type Tropical cyclone Subtropical cyclone Extratropical cyclone, remnant low, tropical disturbance, or monsoon depression

Typhoon Ewiniar emerged from an area of atmospheric convection 441 km (274 mi) southeast of Palau. The disturbance was moving northwestward towards an environment favorable for tropical cyclogenesis, characterized by sea surface temperatures of 29–30 °C (84–86 °F), low vertical wind shear, and moderate to strong outflow aloft associated with an upper tropospheric trough west of the system. On May 22, the Japan Meteorological Agency (JMA) (Note: The Japan Meteorological Agency is the official Regional Specialized Meteorological Center for the western Pacific Ocean.) labeled the system as a low-pressure area. The Joint Typhoon Warning Center (JTWC) (Note: The Joint Typhoon Warning Center is a joint United States Navy – United States Air Force task force that issues tropical cyclone warnings for the western Pacific Ocean and other regions.) subsequently issued a Tropical Cyclone Formation Alert (TCFA) as the disturbance developed rainbands wrapping from the southwest, with deep convection obscuring the system's consolidated circulation center. At 18:00 UTC on May 23, the JMA identified the system as a tropical depression, and later that day, it entered the Philippine Area of Responsibility (PAR). However, later that day, the JTWC cancelled their TCFA, since the depression was still weak. Early morning of May 24, the Philippine Atmospheric, Geophysical and Astronomical Services Administration upgraded the system from a low-pressure area into a depression, assigning it with the name Aghon — a Hiligaynon word for a mariner's compass and the replacement name for Ambo — marking it as the fifth-latest start of a Pacific typhoon season since reliable records began. (Note: The development of Ewiniar made the third-latest time within a season for the first named storm to develop and ended a 157-day period (from December 18, 2023 – May 24, 2024) during which no named storm was active in the basin.)

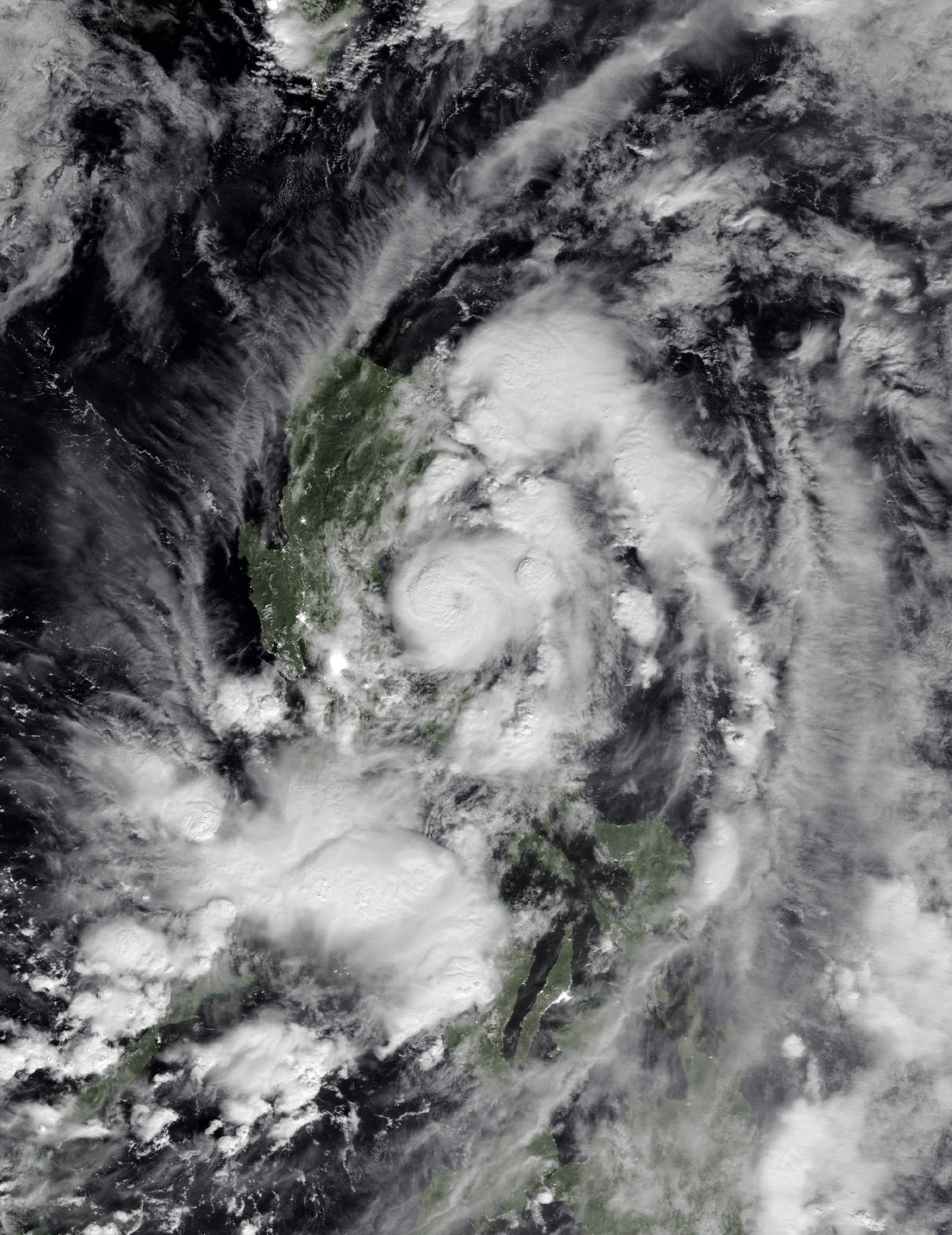
Severe Tropical Storm Ewiniar beginning to move away from the Philippines during the evening of May 26

The JTWC then reissued a TCFA on the system while it was 233 km (145 mi) northeast of Davao City, Philippines. At 18:00 UTC, the JTWC upgraded the system to Tropical Depression 01W based on surface observations from Guiuan. Aghon made its first landfalls over Homonhon Island and Giporlos in Eastern Samar in the early morning of May 25 (PHT). At 12:00 UTC, the JTWC reported that the tropical depression had intensified into a tropical storm while it was still in Tayabas Bay. In the evening, it made five more landfalls over Basiao and Cagduyong Islands of Catbalogan, Samar; Batuan in Ticao Island; Masbate City; and Torrijos, Marinduque. The JMA then classified the system as a tropical storm at 06:00 UTC, assigning it the name Ewiniar. In the morning of May 26 (PHT), the storm made its 8th landfall over Lucena, Quezon in Luzon island; nonetheless, the system developed a small dense overcast holding a ragged, formative eye. The JTWC then reported that Ewiniar had rapidly intensified into a typhoon due to strong equatorward and poleward outflow. In the evening, the storm made its ninth landfall over Patnanungan in the Polillo Islands; however, the outermost deep convective was diminishing because of the topographical effects from Luzon island, and the further development of a poleward outflow channel. Ewiniar then turned northwestward along the northwestern edge of a mid-level subtropical high.

Soon after, the JMA upgraded Ewiniar to a severe tropical storm at 06:00 UTC on May 26 as its maximum sustained winds increased to 100 km/h (65 mph). By 18:00 UTC that same day, Ewiniar had intensified into a typhoon, marking it as the first typhoon of the 2024 Pacific typhoon season; although its structure consolidated, the system's pinhole eye became obscured by cirrus clouds. At 06:00 UTC, the JTWC estimated maximum 1-minute sustained winds of 175 km/h (110 mph), equivalent to a Category 2-equivalent intensity on the Saffir-Simpson scale, though it was slightly weakening as a result of moderate wind shear. Infrared satellite imagery showed a partially-exposed circulation center with deep convection over the southern portion of the storm; however, Ewiniar maintained its convective symmetric structure as it accelerated northeastward. On May 27, the JMA recorded maximum sustained winds of 140 km/h (85 mph) and a minimum barometric pressure of 970 hPa (28.64 inHg) as the system's peak intensity. The storm then deteriorated from subsidence from a mid-latitude trough aloft as evidence by the structure's erosion and warming cloud tops. The center was still well-defined, as its outflow was enhanced by a longwave trough, though wind shear was moderate.

At 12:00 PHT (04:00 UTC) on May 29, the typhoon left the PAR. Shortly afterwards, it passed directly over the island of Minamidaitōjima. At 18:00 UTC, Ewiniar had weakened into a severe tropical storm. Environmental conditions became more unfavorable as sea surface temperatures decrease and vertical shear increases, as dry air invaded the system from the lower troposphere. Stratocumulus cloud lines went towards the elongated central convection due to this while the storm accelerated along the subtropical ridge to its northeast, weakening into a tropical storm as according to the JTWC. On May 30, the JTWC reported that Ewiniar had begun losing its tropical characteristics while 719 km (447 mi) east-northeast of Kadena Air Base in Okinawa, Japan. Moreover, the JMA downgraded Ewiniar to a tropical storm at 06:00 UTC. The storm then developed a cold front to its southwest as deep convection detached from the fully-exposed and asymmetrical center, briefly becoming a subtropical cyclone. By 18:00 UTC on that day, the JMA reported that Ewiniar had transitioned into an extratropical low. The JTWC then ceased issuing advisories on the system the next day as it entered the baroclinic zone and an area of high wind shear. The extratropical remnants of Ewiniar were last noted by the JMA on June 2 near the International Dateline; however, the Ocean Prediction Center indicated that these extratropical remnants crossed the International Dateline and entered the Central North Pacific Ocean late on June 3. On June 6, Ewiniar's remnant was absorbed into another extratropical cyclone, just south of Prince William Sound.

== Preparations ==
=== Philippines ===
==== Highest Tropical Cyclone Wind Signal ====
Highest Tropical Cyclone Wind Signal issued by PAGASA for Ewiniar (Aghon) in each province. The white line represents the best track.

TCWS#	Luzon	Visayas	Mindanao
3	Eastern Portion of Quezon, Polillo Island	None	None
2	Eastern Portion of Isabela, Aurora, Eastern and Central Portions of Rizal, Eastern Portion of Batangas, Laguna, Northern Portion of Camarines Norte	None	None
1	Central Portion of Isabela, Eastern and Central Portions of Quirino, Eastern and Southern Portions of Nueva Ecija, Bulacan, Eastern Portion of Pampanga, Southern Portion of Bataan, Metro Manila, Cavite, Rest of Batangas, Rest of Rizal, Rest of Quezon, Marinduque, Eastern Portion of Occidental Mindoro, Northern and Central Portions of Oriental Mindoro, Romblon, Albay, Burias Island, Camarines Sur, Catanduanes, Rest of Camarines Norte, Sorsogon, Ticao Island	Bantayan Island, Northern Portion of Cebu, Camotes Islands, Eastern Portion of Bohol, Biliran, Leyte, Southern Leyte, Eastern Samar, Northern Samar, Samar	Bucas Grande Island, Dinagat Island, Siargao Island, Agusan del Norte, Eastern Portion of Agusan del Sur, Surigao del Norte, Surigao del Sur

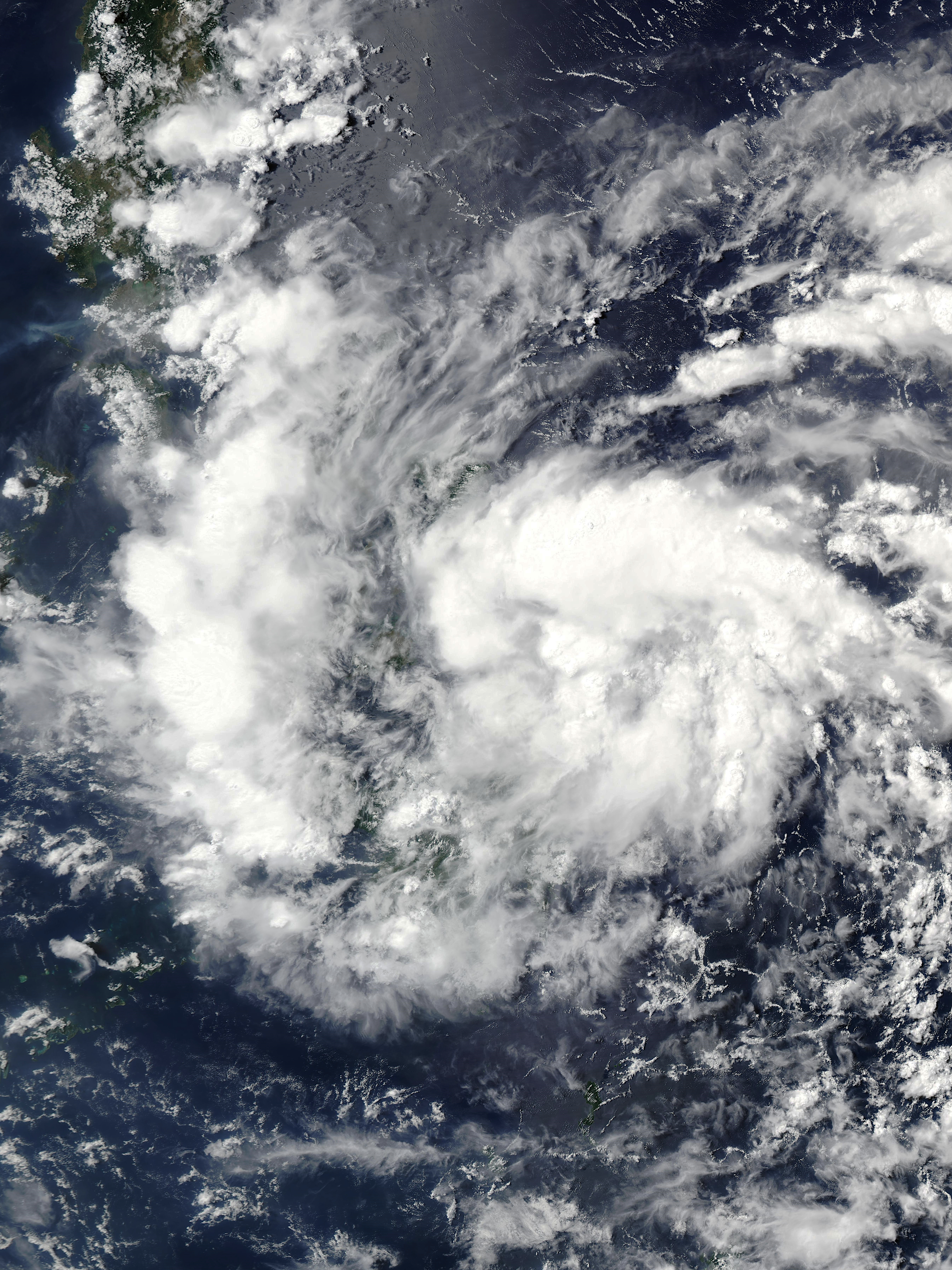
Tropical Depression Aghon nearing the Philippine Islands on May 24

Upon the system's designation as a tropical depression, the Philippine Atmospheric, Geophysical, and Astronomical Services Administration issued Tropical Cyclone Wind Signal No. 1 from Sorsogon, part of Albay, Catanduanes, part of Camarines Sur, Samar, Northern Samar, part of Leyte, the entire province of Surigao del Norte, and Surigao del Sur. Ewiniar also raised Signal No. 1 alerts from the eastern portions of Bulacan, Nueva Ecija, Quezon, Laguna, Rizal, and Romblon, and the entirety of Aurora, Marinduque, Camarines Norte, Masbate, Eastern Samar, Southern Leyte, Bohol, Dinagat Islands, Agusan del Sur, and Agusan del Norte. Flights arriving and departing were cancelled because of the adverse weather conditions, with eleven domestic flights and one international flight. The National Disaster Risk Reduction and Management Council reported that 65 people were preemptively evacuated.

After Ewiniar reached the severe tropical storm category on the afternoon of May 26, the agency raised Signal No. 3, indicating an expectation of winds of 89–117 km/h (55–73 mph) within the next 18 hours for the eastern section of Quezon, including the Polillo Islands, while storm signals were also raised in Metro Manila and parts of Bataan, Batangas, Pampanga and Oriental Mindoro. Moving northeastward and then intensified into a typhoon category, the agency raised Signal No. 1 in parts of Quirino, Nueva Vizcaya, Isabela, and Camarines Norte. Classes and government work in some parts of Metro Manila, Aurora, Laguna, Quezon, Batangas, Cavite, and Nueva Ecija were suspended due to the typhoon. The University of the Philippines Los Baños also suspended classes due to the inclement weather brought by Ewiniar.

=== Japan ===
The Japanese government issued a high alert as Ewiniar was likely to enhance a stationary front near the nation, which would cause heavy rainfall throughout Japan. On May 27, the JMA stated that the typhoon would bring heavy rain to portions of Okinawa Prefecture. Weather warnings were also raised in the Izu Islands and the Kantō region.

== Impact and aftermath ==
=== Philippines ===
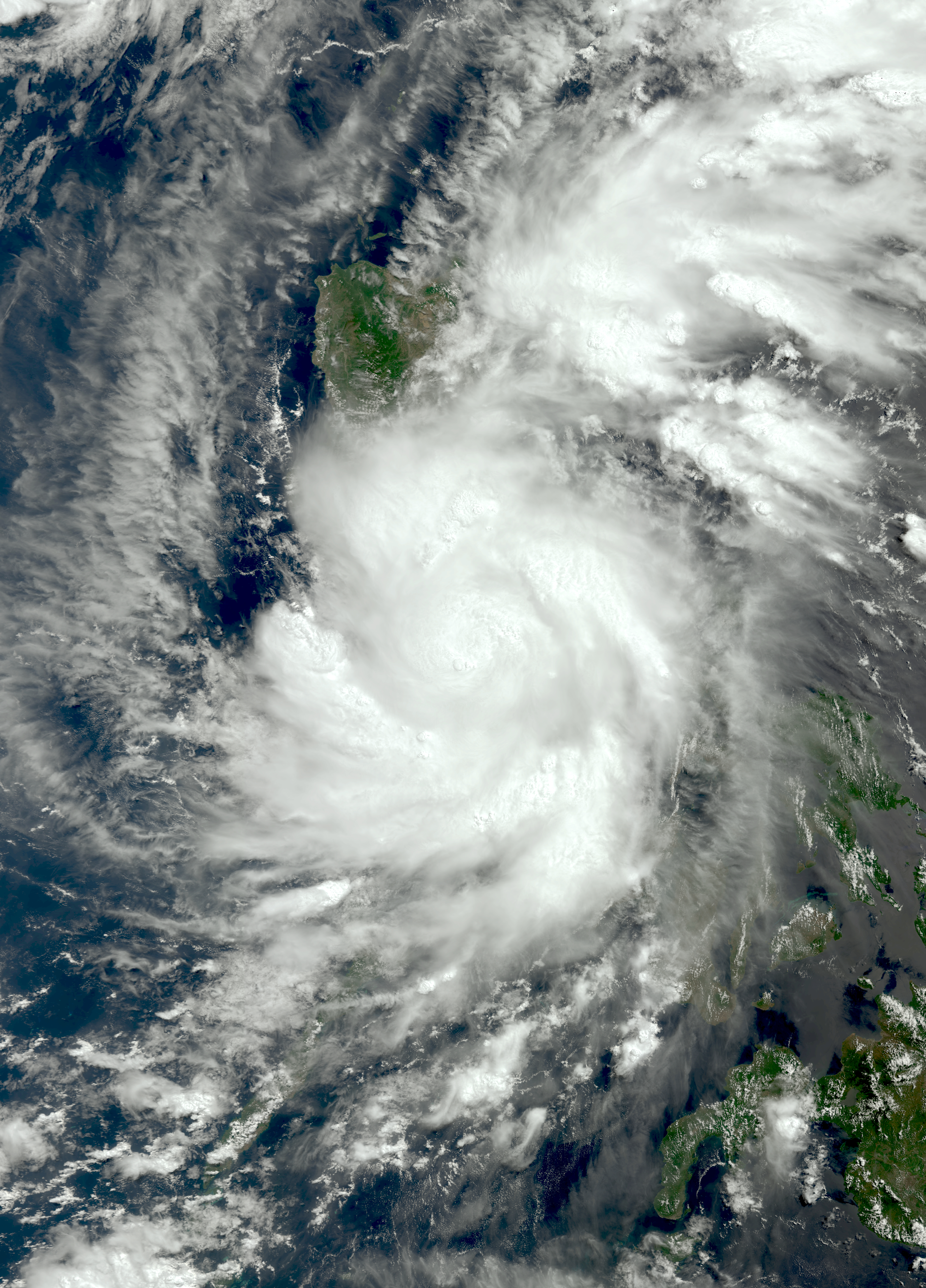
Ewiniar intensifying over the Philippines during the morning of May 26

Typhoon Ewiniar (known as "Aghon" in the Philippines) made multiple landfalls over the Philippine archipelago over the course of several days. Following the passage of Ewiniar, it marked the beginning of the nation's rainy season on May 29, 2024. Some flooding occurred in Misamis Oriental, Eastern Visayas, and Bicol on May 25, causing a tree in Legazpi, Albay to fall down and injure three people. A tornado also spawned in Lavezares, Northern Samar, destroying four houses and damaging eight others. A passenger boat sank in stormy waters off the coast of Aroroy, Masbate, leading to the rescue of its 35 passengers and crew. In Bicol, four people were injured, and almost 6,000 people were stranded in ports after sea travel was suspended, while 600 others were also stranded in ports in Eastern Visayas. A power outage occurred in parts of Eastern Samar. A falling tree destroyed two vehicles in Taytay, Rizal. Flooding and power outages occurred in Quezon and Laguna Provinces, while a barge ran aground in Mauban. A landslide blocked a road in Dinapigue, Isabela. Rough sea conditions also damaged an oil container on board a ship in New Washington, Aklan, causing an oil spill. Around 7,175 were stranded in ports across the Philippines due to the storm. As rains continued throughout the day, the Angat Dam reached its spilling level of 179.79 meters (589.9 ft), while the Ipo Dam also reached its spilling level of 99.96 meters (328.0 ft). A total of 7,659 homes were affected, including 752 which were destroyed. Power outages were reported in 115 cities and municipalities. At least 21,000 ha (52,000 acres) of farmland in Calabarzon, Bicol Region, and Eastern Visayas suffered damage. Across the Philippines, roads were blocked in 57 places, and two bridge was rendered impassable by vehicles. Nineteen houses were washed away by strong waves in Tanza, Cavite. One infant drowned after a house was swept away by floods in Padre Burgos, Quezon, while two others were killed by falling trees in San Antonio, Quezon and Lucena. A minor was also killed by a falling tree in Misamis Oriental.

After Ewiniar left the Philippines, Lucena, Quezon, was declared in a state of calamity. along with the 1st and 2nd districts of Quezon. The NDRRMC reports that assistance and relief goods worth ₱15.3 million (US$263,000) have been distributed to affected families. The assistance provided varies, both in type and agency responsible, with most of the relief provided being food packs from the Department of Social Welfare and Development. The government also provided ₱1.2 million (US$20,600) and an allocation of ₱3 billion (US$51.6 million) worth of aid to the victims. As of 6 June 2024, the NDRRMC estimated damages in the agricultural sector to be ₱85.6 million (US$1.47 million). The NDRRMC also reported damage to infrastructure estimated at ₱943 million (US$16.2 million), for a total of ₱1.03 billion (US$17.7 million) in damages. Overall, Typhoon Ewiniar killed six people and left eight injured, and around 152,266 others were affected by Ewiniar in the Philippines.

=== Japan ===
Sustained winds of 20 km/h (12 mph) were recorded as the storm passed directly over the island of Minamidaitōjima. Intense winds occurred in Kitadaitō, Okinawa. A maximum wind gust of 89 km/h (55 mph) was recorded. Accumulated rainfall totaled 52.5 mm (2.07 in) in the village of Miyake, Tokyo, and 36 mm (1.4 in) in Chuo Ward.

== Retirement ==
On February 20, 2025, PAGASA announced that the name Aghon was retired from the rotating naming lists after it caused over ₱1 billion pesos in damage throughout its onslaught despite its first usage and it will never be used again as a typhoon name within the Philippine Area of Responsibility. It will be replaced with Amuyao — a Filipino local name for a mountain in Mountain Province — for the 2028 season.

At their 57th Session in February 2025, the ESCAP/WMO Typhoon Committee announced that the name Ewiniar, along with eight others, would be retired from the naming lists for the Western Pacific. In the spring of 2026, the name will be replaced with Tirou for the future seasons, which is a respectful way to say "excuse me" in Chuukese.

== See also ==
- Weather of 2024
- Tropical cyclones in 2024
- Other systems named Ewiniar
- List of Philippine typhoons (2000–present)
- Typhoon Vicki (1998)
