= Tropical Storm Maliksi (2018) =

West Pacific Tropical storm in 2018

Severe Tropical Storm Maliksi (Domeng)
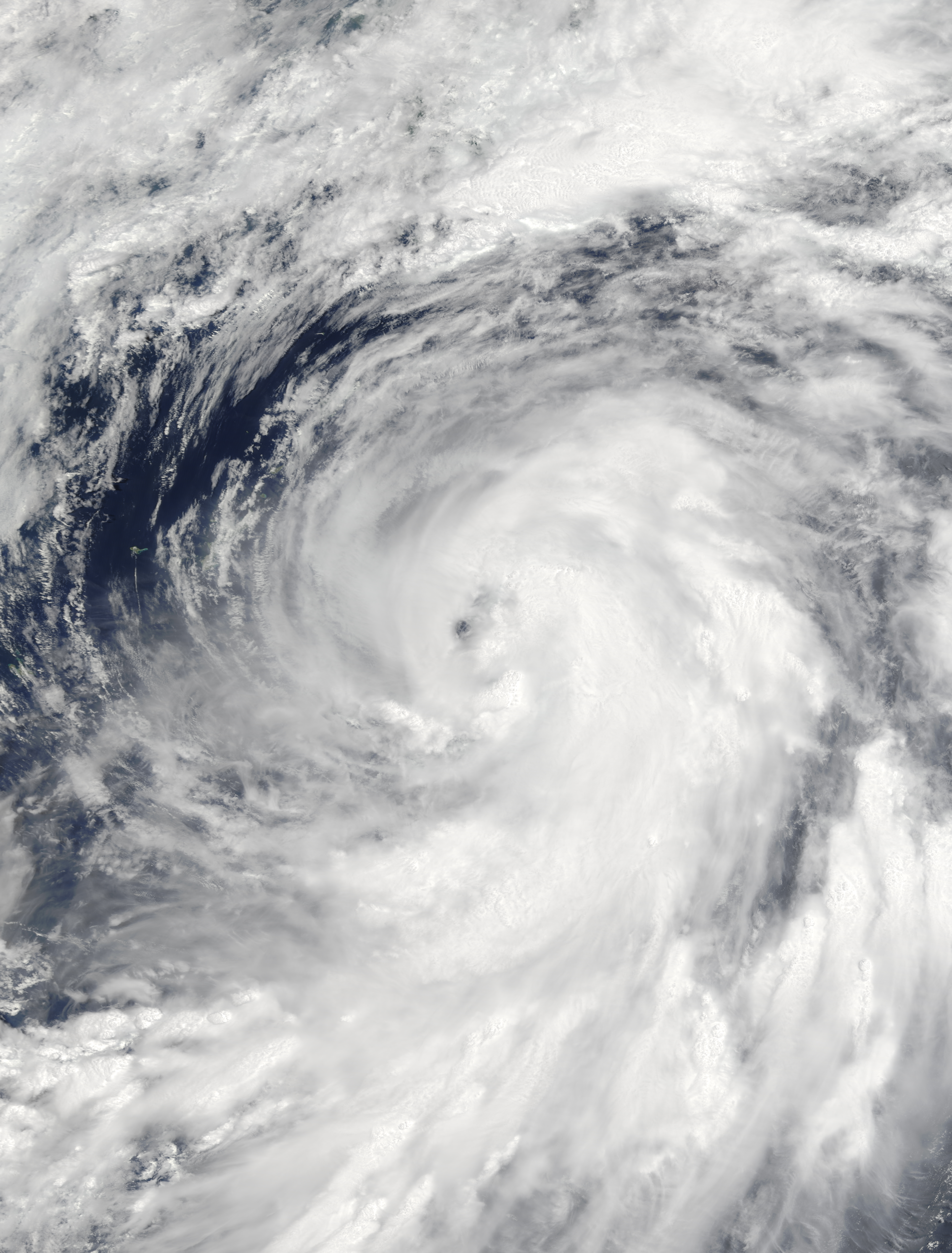
- Severe Tropical Storm Maliksi at peak intensity on June 10

Meteorological history
- Formed: June 3, 2018
- Extratropical: June 11, 2018
- Dissipated: June 13, 2018

Severe tropical storm
- 10-minute sustained (JMA)
- Highest winds: 110 km/h (70 mph)
- Lowest pressure: 970 hPa (mbar); 28.64 inHg

Tropical storm
- 1-minute sustained (SSHWS/JTWC)
- Highest winds: 110 km/h (70 mph)
- Lowest pressure: 974 hPa (mbar); 28.76 inHg

Overall effects
- Fatalities: 2 total
- Areas affected: Philippines, Japan
- IBTrACS
- Part of the 2018 Pacific typhoon season

Severe Tropical Storm Maliksi, (Note: The name Maliksi (Tagalog: maliksi, [mɐlɪkˈsɪʔ]) was contributed by the Philippines and means "to be agile" in Tagalog.) known in the Philippines as Severe Tropical Storm Domeng, was a tropical cyclone in early June 2018 that brought rainfall to the Philippines and Japan. It caused 2 deaths and prompted the PAGASA to declare the beginning of the rainy season in the Philippines. The fifth named storm and 4th tropical cyclone in the Philippine Area of Responsibility (PAR), it was first noted as an area of convection in the South of Palau on May 31.

The system continued to organize over favorable conditions until PAGASA locally named it Domeng on June 5, as well as designating the depression as 06W two days later. JMA later named 06W as Maliksi as it was upgraded into a tropical storm six hours later. As it moved northeast, Maliksi reached its peak intensity as a severe tropical storm, with maximum sustained winds of 110 km/h (70 mph) and a minimum barometric pressure of 970 hPa (28.64 inHg). Shortly after, convection around the center of Maliksi began to decrease on June 11 until it underwent extratropical transition, noting that it is over unfavorable conditions. Maliksi was last noted east of Honshu on June 13.

Upon Maliksi’s formation, it enhanced the southwest monsoon in the Philippines, bringing monsoonal rains over Luzon and Visayas. It also led to its declaration of rainy season due to widespread rainfall in PAGASA weather stations.

== Meteorological history ==
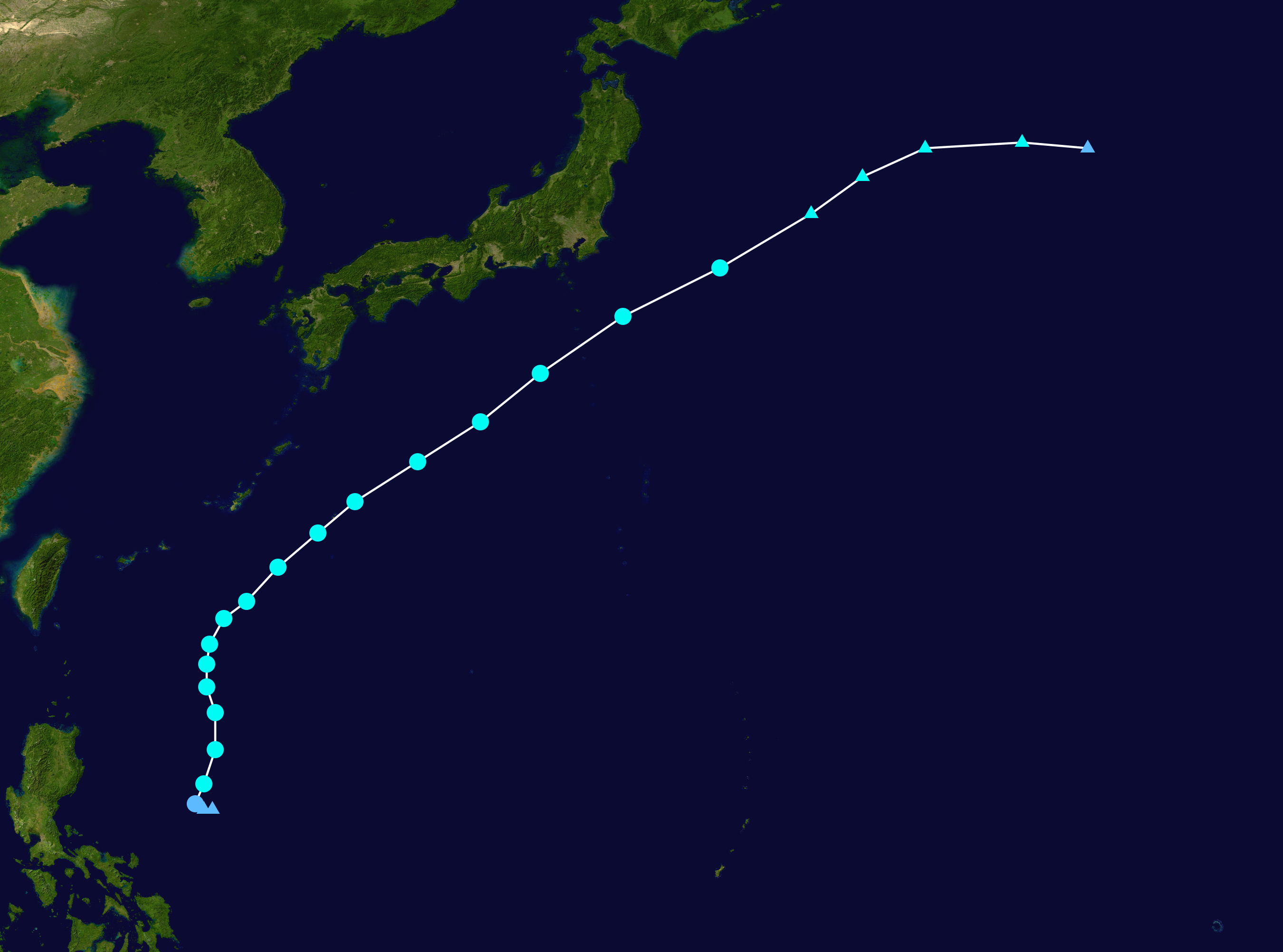
Map plotting the storm's track and intensity, according to the Saffir–Simpson scale Map key Saffir–Simpson scale Tropical depression (≤38 mph, ≤62 km/h) Tropical storm (39–73 mph, 63–118 km/h) Category 1 (74–95 mph, 119–153 km/h) Category 2 (96–110 mph, 154–177 km/h) Category 3 (111–129 mph, 178–208 km/h) Category 4 (130–156 mph, 209–251 km/h) Category 5 (≥157 mph, ≥252 km/h) Unknown Storm type Tropical cyclone Subtropical cyclone Extratropical cyclone, remnant low, tropical disturbance, or monsoon depression

On May 31 at 06:00 UTC, the Joint Typhoon Warning Center (JTWC) began monitoring an area of convection approximately 95 nautical miles (175 km; 110 mi) south of Palau. The system was disorganized, with convection being located to the east of a broad and elongated low-level circulation. It was located in favorable conditions for development and sea surface temperatures in the area ranged from 29–30 °C (84–86 °F), though the JTWC assessed its development potential in the next day as low. The system's low-level circulation began consolidating, and on June 2 at 00:30 UTC, the JTWC upgraded its development potential in the next day to medium. On June 3 at 18:00 UTC, the Japan Meteorological Agency (JMA) assessed that a tropical depression had formed over the Philippine Sea. (Note: The Japan Meteorological Agency is the official Regional Specialized Meteorological Center for the western Pacific Ocean.) On the next day at 03:00 UTC, the PAGASA gave the depression the local name Domeng as it was located 675 kilometres (420 mi) east of Guiuan. The depression absorbed an invest as convection covered the low-level circulation, and on 14:00 UTC the same day, the JTWC issued a Tropical Cyclone Formation Alert as it was located approximately 225 nautical miles (415 km; 260 mi) northwest of Palau.

The depression began to exhibit signs of anticyclonic outflow as it was steered northward by a mid-level subtropical high-pressure area, and on June 7 at 12:00 UTC, the JTWC upgraded the system to a tropical depression, assigning it the designation 06W. 6 hours later at 18:00 UTC, both the JMA and the JTWC upgraded the depression to a tropical storm, with the JMA giving it the name Maliksi; the system's circulation remained broad. Maliksi passed by the western edge of the high-pressure area and turned northeast, and on June 9 at 06:00 UTC, the JMA upgraded it to a severe tropical storm. At 21:00 UTC, Maliksi exited the PAR, with the PAGASA issuing its final warning on the system. On June 10 at 00:00 UTC, Maliksi peaked in intensity, with maximum sustained winds of 110 km/h (70 mph) and a minimum barometric pressure of 970 hPa (29 inHg) as it was located southeast of Okinawa. (Note: All winds are in 10-minute sustained standards, as per the Japan Meteorological Agency, unless otherwise stated.) The JTWC assessed Maliksi to have peaked at the same time, also estimating the same windspeed in the 1-minute sustained standard. (Note: The Joint Typhoon Warning Center uses 1-minute sustained winds to measure wind speeds for tropical cyclones.) Maliksi began slowly accelerating to the northeast, developing a ragged eye as it became exposed to strong westerlies. After reaching peak intensity, convection around the center began to decrease, with the low-level circulation beginning to elongate. Maliksi began extratropical transition as it was located over an unfavorable environment, and on June 11 at 18:00 UTC, the JMA assessed that Maliksi completed its transition into an extratropical cyclone, with its low-level circulation being displaced from its upper-level circulation; the JTWC estimated extratropical transition began 6 hours earlier. Maliksi's remnants dissipated east of Honshu on June 13.

== Preparations, impact, and aftermath ==
=== Philippines ===
The PAGASA warned residents of possible floods and landslides, advising fishermen not to go to sea. Beginning June 5, classes were suspended in parts of Luzon and the province of Biliran. 73 people were evacuated in Calabarzon.

Maliksi enhanced the southwest monsoon in the Philippines, bringing monsoonal rains over Luzon and Visayas. A bridge received damage in San Fernando, Romblon, and on Tablas Island, power went out for a day due to fallen trees impacting power lines. Patients in the University of Santo Tomas Hospital were evacuated after floodwaters entered the building. Trees were uprooted in Quezon City and Coron, Palawan, and in Calintaan, a temporary bridge was washed out by a river. 16 houses were damaged in San Fernando, Pampanga, six of which were completely damaged. A SkyJet Airlines flight on route from Metro Manila overshot the runway at Francisco B. Reyes Airport, injuring 2 of 86 on board, including the first officer. In Batangas, 8 municipalities lost power on June 9 at 3:00 PM local time, before being restored 6 hours later. In Metro Manila, overnight rains flooded at least 43 barangays, with several streets becoming impassable. Floods in parts of Quezon City's 4th congressional district reached 5 feet (150 cm). On June 9 at 11:00 PM local time, due to the heavy rainfall in Metro Manila, the PAGASA issued a red rainfall advisory for the area, along with other warnings for the regions of Calabarzon and Central Luzon. Two people from Palawan and Albay drowned after jumping or falling into the ocean. 72 passengers and 2 vessels were stranded in Legazpi, Albay and Rapu-Rapu, with other ports in Oriental Mindoro suspending their operations. A total of 132 people were affected in San Fernando, Pampanga and Santa Cruz, Zambales.

Due to the effects of Maliksi, the PAGASA declared the beginning of the rainy season due to widespread rainfall in PAGASA weather stations. Those affected in San Fernando, Pampanga received ₱41 thousand (US$770) worth of aid.

=== Japan ===
As Maliksi approached Okinawa, its meteorological observatory cautioned of high waves around the island. The outer road at Kitadaitōjima was closed on June 9, with all fishing vessels being brought to port. Sea and air travel near the Daitō Islands were interrupted on June 10. On the same day, the Okinawa Meteorological Observatory issued a storm warning for the Daitō Islands, with Kitadaitōjima receiving an evacuation advisory.

On the island of Hachijō-jima, 287.5 millimetres (11.32 in) of precipitation was recorded, and on Kitadaitōjima, a gust of 28.3 metres per second (100 km/h; 65 mph) was recorded. In Chichibu, Saitama, there were rains around noon as the storm was approaching the Kantō Region, though winds were not strong. Some sugarcane crop in Kitadaitōjima was damaged due to strong winds.

== See also ==
- Weather of 2018
- Tropical cyclones in 2018
