= Tropical Storm Ewiniar (2018) =

Pacific tropical storm in 2018

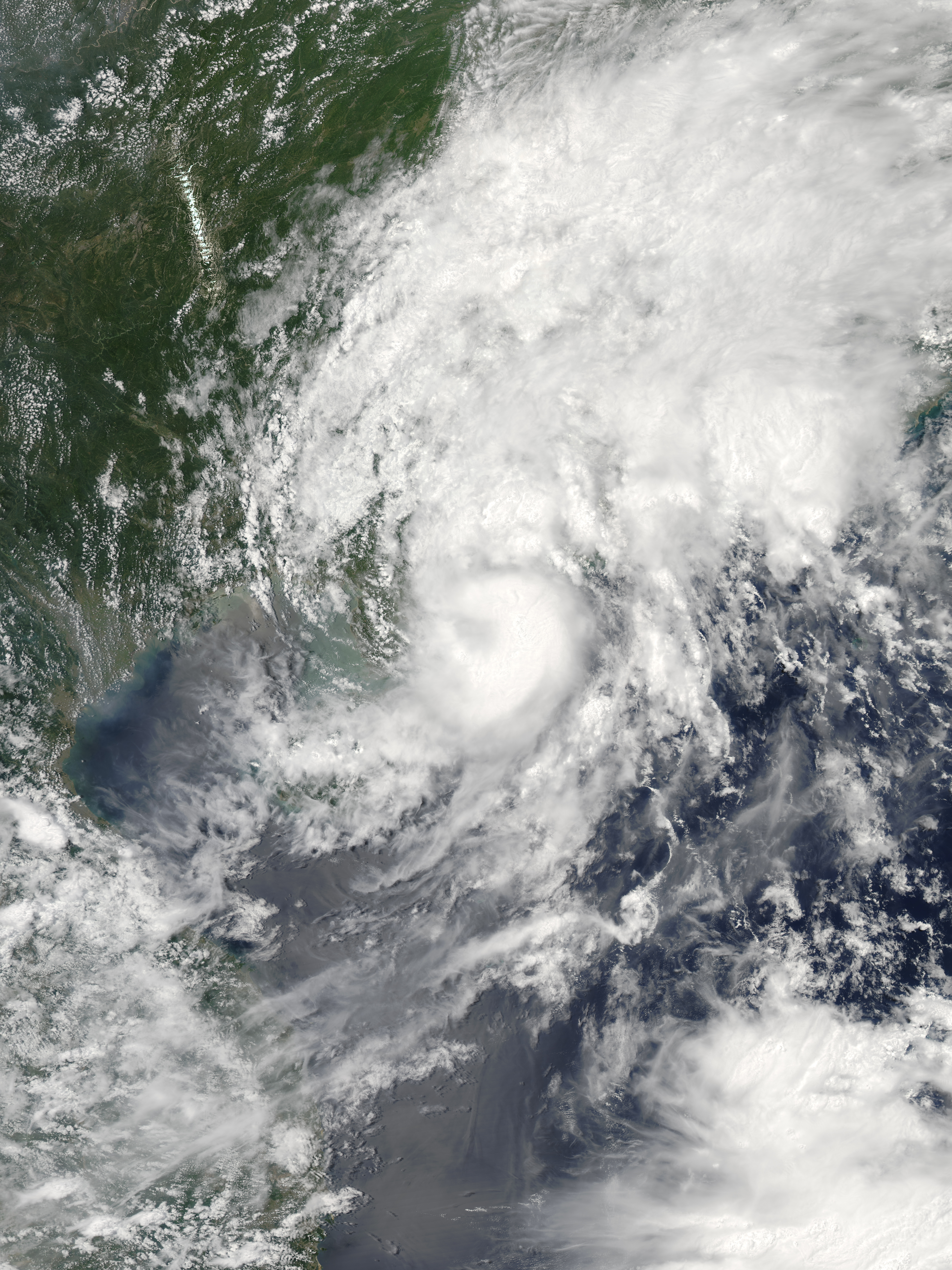
- Tropical Storm Ewiniar at peak strength shortly before landfall on June 7

Meteorological history
- Formed: June 2, 2018
- Dissipated: June 11, 2018

Tropical storm
- 10-minute sustained (JMA)
- Highest winds: 75 km/h (45 mph)
- Lowest pressure: 998 hPa (mbar); 29.47 inHg

Tropical storm
- 1-minute sustained (SSHWS/JTWC)
- Highest winds: 75 km/h (45 mph)
- Lowest pressure: 996 hPa (mbar); 29.41 inHg

Overall effects
- Fatalities: 14 total
- Economic losses: CN¥ 5.19 billion (US$784,000,000 in 2018)
- Areas affected: Vietnam, South China
- IBTrACS
- Part of the 2018 Pacific typhoon season

Tropical Storm Ewiniar (Note: The name Ewiniar (Chuukese: Éwúniyár, [əwɨnijar]) was contributed by the Federated States of Micronesia and refers to a storm god in Chuukese.) was a tropical cyclone in early June 2018 that brought prolonged heavy rains to Vietnam and South China, causing damaging floods and landslides. The fourth named storm of the 2018 Pacific typhoon season, Ewiniar developed as a tropical depression just east of Vietnam on June 2. The system moved generally northwards over the South China Sea, before intensifying into a tropical storm near the Qiongzhou Strait on June 5. Ewiniar proceeded to stall over the region as steering currents collapsed, making landfall over the Leizhou Peninsula and later over northern Hainan. Ewiniar accelerated to the northeast on June 7 and moved back over open sea, allowing it to strengthen slightly and reach peak intensity with maximum sustained winds of 75 km/h (47 mph) and a central pressure of 998 hPa (mbar; 29.57 inHg). The storm made landfall in eastern Guangdong shortly thereafter and weakened into a tropical depression on June 8. The system ultimately dissipated east of Taiwan on June 11.

In combination with the southwest monsoon, Ewiniar dumped heavy rain over Vietnam and South China for over a week. In Vietnam, a few houses were damaged and one person was killed. Roads in Ho Chi Minh City were inundated. In Hainan and Guangdong, over a hundred flights were cancelled and ships were forced to return to port to take shelter. Daily rainfall records for June were set in eight cities. Twenty-nine houses were destroyed and over 27,000 hectares (67,000 acres) of crops were damaged. Landslides killed five people in Yunfu and left one missing in Jiangmen. Strong winds blew down a construction site in Guangzhou, killing one and injuring eight, and caused a building collapse in Shenzhen that killed four and injured four others. Another two people were electrocuted by faulty wiring. A tornado occurred in Foshan, damaging a market and three vehicles. Travel disruptions also posed difficulties for students taking the National College Entrance Examination. A total of 13 people were killed in South China and direct economic losses were valued at ¥5.19 billion (US$784 million). (Note: All currencies are in their 2018 values and are converted to United States dollars using data from the International Monetary Fund published by the World Bank.) In Hong Kong and Macao, strong wind signals were issued and some schools were closed. Gusty winds felled trees and heavy rains caused flash flooding, while a waterspout was sighted near Cheung Chau.

== Meteorological history ==
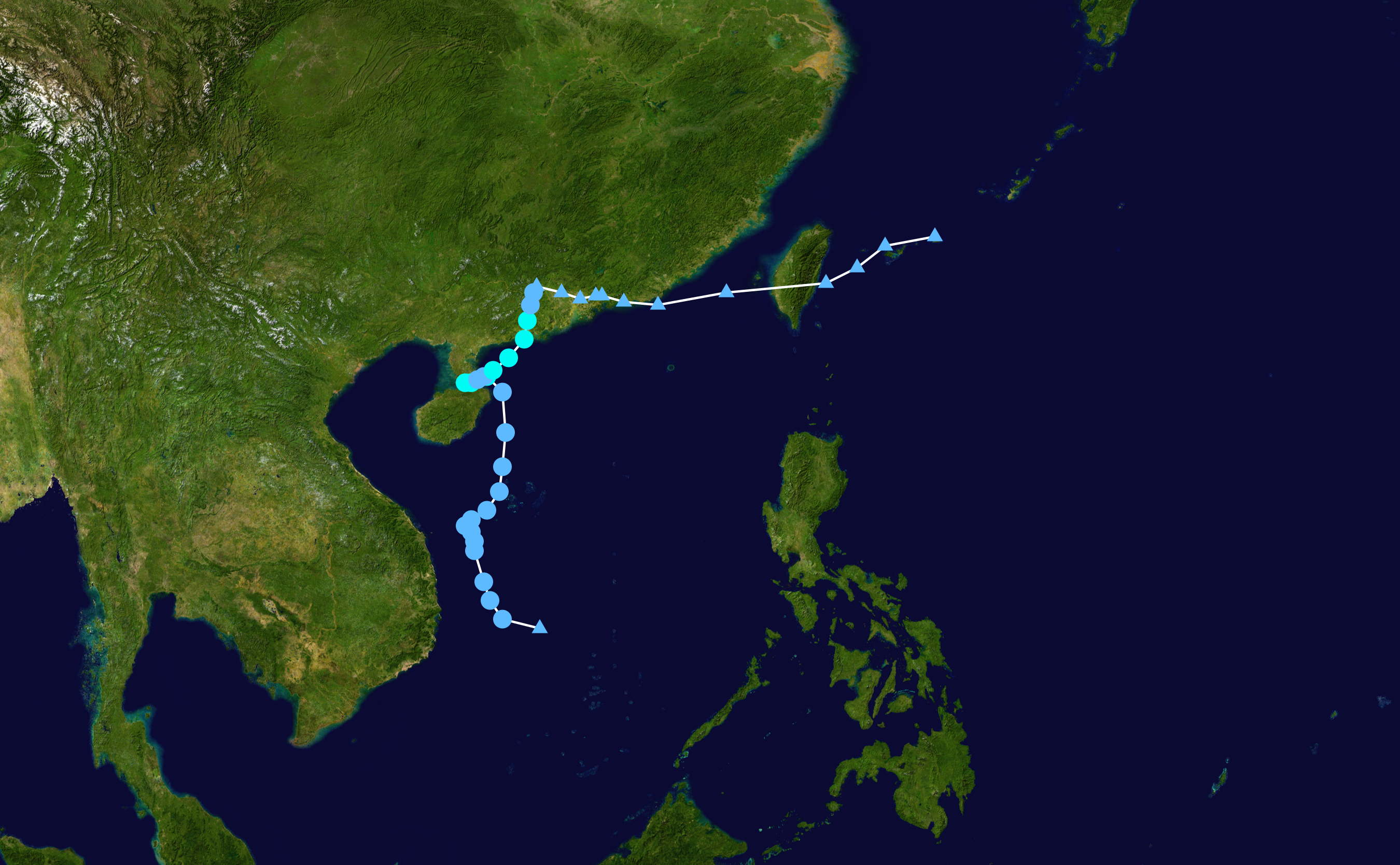
Map plotting the storm's track and intensity, according to the Saffir–Simpson scale Map key Saffir–Simpson scale Tropical depression (≤38 mph, ≤62 km/h) Tropical storm (39–73 mph, 63–118 km/h) Category 1 (74–95 mph, 119–153 km/h) Category 2 (96–110 mph, 154–177 km/h) Category 3 (111–129 mph, 178–208 km/h) Category 4 (130–156 mph, 209–251 km/h) Category 5 (≥157 mph, ≥252 km/h) Unknown Storm type Tropical cyclone Subtropical cyclone Extratropical cyclone, remnant low, tropical disturbance, or monsoon depression

Ewiniar originated from an area of scattered thunderstorms that developed just southeast of Puerto Princesa on May 31. The system moved northwest and consolidated, with the Joint Typhoon Warning Center (JTWC) determining that it consolidated into a tropical depression at 12:00 UTC on June 2. The Japan Meteorological Agency (JMA) followed suit six hours later, by which time the system was about 300 km (190 mi) off the coast of Vietnam. (Note: The Japan Meteorological Agency is the official Regional Specialized Meteorological Center for the western Pacific Ocean.) The depression, pushed northwest by a subtropical ridge to its northeast, organized only slowly amid an environment marginally conducive to intensification, with wind shear limiting convection mostly to the depression's western flank. The depression changed little in strength on June 3 and 4 as it turned further north around the western edge of the aforementioned ridge, eventually curving to the north-northeast on June 5. Around this time, thunderstorm activity increased in coverage with the development of outflow channels; as a result, the JMA upgraded the depression to Tropical Storm Ewiniar at 00:00 UTC. Wind shear decreased later on June 5, allowing Ewiniar to maintain thunderstorms near its center and intensify slightly. The JTWC upgraded the system to a tropical storm at 18:00 UTC as the storm's motion slowed and turned back to the northwest.

The subtropical ridge steering the storm collapsed thereafter, leaving Ewiniar in a zone of weak steering currents over the Qiongzhou Strait. The system made landfall in Xuwen, Guangdong, at 22:25 UTC on June 5, before turning southwest and making another landfall in Haikou, Hainan, at 06:50 UTC on June 6. While over the Leizhou Peninsula, the JTWC assessed that Ewiniar weakened back into a tropical depression, whereas the JMA maintained the system at tropical storm intensity. On June 7, Ewiniar finally began to accelerate east-northeastwards ahead of a shortwave trough. This moved Ewiniar back over water and allowed it to restrengthen, reaching peak intensity with maximum sustained winds of 75 km/h (47 mph) and a minimum pressure of 998 hPa (mbar; 29.57 inHg) at 06:00 UTC. Ewiniar then turned to the north-northeast as it began to interact with the Meiyu front, before making a third landfall in Yangjiang, Guangdong, at 12:30 UTC June 7. Once inland, the system soon became embedded within the Meiyu front and the JTWC declared that Ewiniar dissipated as a tropical cyclone near midday on June 8. The JMA, however, continued to track Ewiniar as a tropical depression while the system turned back east and emerged over the South China Sea on June 10. After crossing Taiwan on June 11, Ewiniar was finally declared to have dissipated by the JMA.

== Preparations and impact ==
=== Vietnam ===
Ewiniar combined with the southwest monsoon to produce thunderstorms and gusty winds over Vietnam. Farmers were urged to complete the rice harvest before the onset of heavy rain. Tourists were evacuated from the Chàm Islands, while about 2,000 tourists were stranded on Lý Sơn Island. Several roads in Ho Chi Minh City were inundated with water up to 30 cm (12 in) deep. Landslides damaged three houses in Lào Cai Province and two more in Thanh Hóa Province, while floods washed away two houses in Cao Bằng Province. A person was killed in Quan Sơn District.

=== Mainland China ===
Ewiniar brought heavy rain to South China and Jiangnan for seven days, affecting 211,200 people with floods and landslides. Rainfall totals exceeded 250 mm (9.8 in) over 66,000 km^{2} (25,000 mi^{2}) of land. A peak rainfall accumulation of 845 mm (33.3 in) was observed at Luotang Reservoir in Guangdong. Eight cities saw new records for highest daily rainfall in June. In Hainan, schools were closed in the capital Haikou. About 5,530 people (mostly fishermen) were moved to safety. High-speed rail services around the island were suspended and the Yuehai Ferry halted operations, while dozens of flights were cancelled at Haikou Meilan International Airport and Sanya Phoenix International Airport. The Qiongzhou Strait was closed to passenger ships on June 4 and 5. In Guangdong, 73,000 residents were evacuated to over 3,000 emergency shelters. At Guangzhou Baiyun International Airport, 73 outbound flights and 71 inbound flights were cancelled. A total of 404 ships docked in the Port of Zhanjiang for shelter.

The passage of Ewiniar resulted in 13 fatalities and direct economic losses of ¥5.19 billion (US$784 million). Landslides killed five people in Xinxing County and caused another person in Jiangmen to go missing. Twenty-nine houses collapsed and 27,350 hectares (67,600 acres) of crops were damaged. In Foshan, two women died after being electrocuted by faulty electrical wiring on a digital billboard at a bus stop. Ewiniar also spawned a tornado in Dali, which blew off a market's 400 m^{2} (4,300 sq ft) roof and damaged three cars but caused no casualties. A construction site in Nansha District collapsed under strong winds, killing one and injuring eight others. Heavy rain caused the exterior of a building in Longgang District, Shenzhen, to collapse, resulting in four deaths and four injuries. Roads were blocked by floods in Haikou, disrupting traffic. Floods occurred during the National College Entrance Examinations on June 7–8, obstructing students' travel. Police and firefighters were dispatched to ensure students and teachers could reach their examination centers safely and on time. In Zhaoqing, 200 students were ferried to their examination centers using trucks, dinghies, and steamboats. Insured losses in Guangdong (excluding the city of Shenzhen) were approximately ¥300 million (US$45 million). Authorities allocated ¥290,000 (US$44,000) of funds for disaster relief and distributed bottled water, food, tents, beds, and towels to displaced residents.

=== Hong Kong and Macao ===
Ewiniar was the first tropical cyclone to affect Hong Kong in 2018. The system brought flooding rain and squalls to Hong Kong from June 5–8. Rainfall totals across the region mostly exceeded 250 mm (9.8 in); northeast parts of the New Territories recorded over 400 mm (16 in) of rain. The No. 3 Strong Wind Signal was raised over the territory from June 7–8, during which kindergartens and schools for children with disabilities were closed and bunker operations at the Port of Hong Kong were suspended. Fallen trees damaged vehicles and obstructed traffic, with one such incident in Sai Wan Ho resulting in an injury. Flooding occurred in several areas in the city, with reported incidents in Kam Shan, Diamond Hill, and Man Kam To. A waterspout was sighted near Cheung Chau on June 7. A storm surge of 0.68 m (2.2 ft) was measured at Tsim Bei Tsui. In neighboring Macao, the No. 3 Strong Wind Signal was also issued from June 7–8. Rainfall accumulations from June 6–8 reached 200 mm (7.9 in). Periods of intense rain, peaking at 46 mm (1.8 in) in one hour on the morning of June 8, caused several instances of flash flooding.

== See also ==
- Other tropical cyclones named Ewiniar
- Weather of 2018
- Tropical cyclones in 2018
- Tropical Storm Russ (1994) – another damaging June system that brought severe flooding to South China
- Tropical Storm Hagibis (2014) – brought torrential rainfall to Guangdong in June
