= List of storms named Ewiniar =

The name Ewiniar (Chuukese: Éwúniyár, [əwɨn̩ijar]) has been used for five tropical cyclones in the Western Pacific Ocean. The name was contributed by the Federated States of Micronesia and is the name of a storm god, literally meaning "waterspout" in Chuukese.

- Typhoon Ewiniar (2000) (T0009, 15W) – a moderate typhoon which did not affect land.
- Typhoon Ewiniar (2006) (T0603, 04W, Ester) – a strong and deadly typhoon that passed over South Korea.
- Severe Tropical Storm Ewiniar (2012) (T1218, 19W) – a strong tropical storm that churned out of the ocean.
- Tropical Storm Ewiniar (2018) (T1804, 05W) – a weak tropical storm which brought heavy rains to Vietnam and South China.
- Typhoon Ewiniar (2024) (T2401, 01W, Aghon) – a fairly strong typhoon that traversed the central Philippines.

The name Ewiniar was retired following the 2024 Pacific typhoon season and was replaced with Tirou (Chuukese: tirow, [t̪irow]), which refers to a respectful way to say "excuse me" in Chuukese.
