= Weather of 2018 =

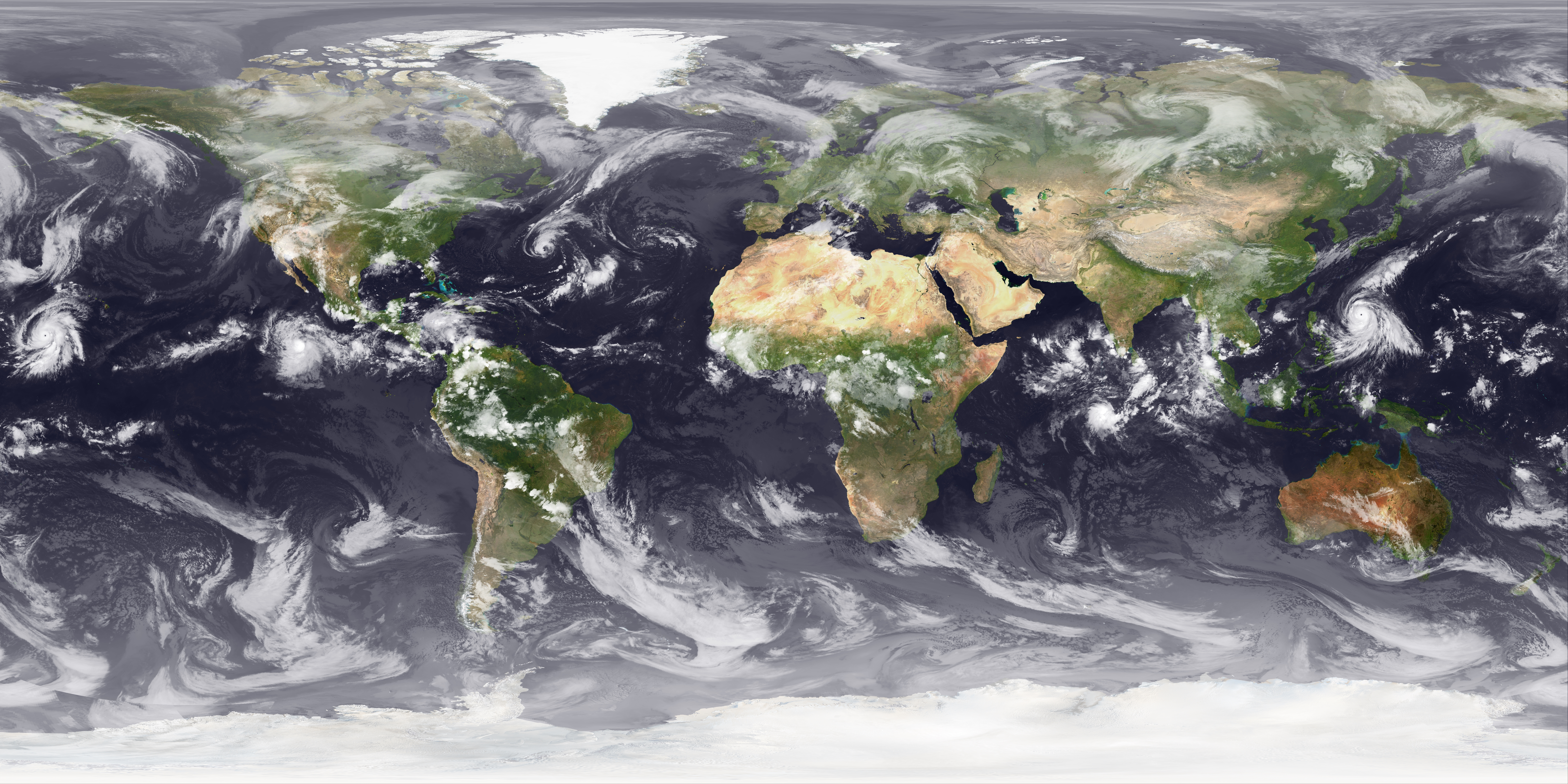
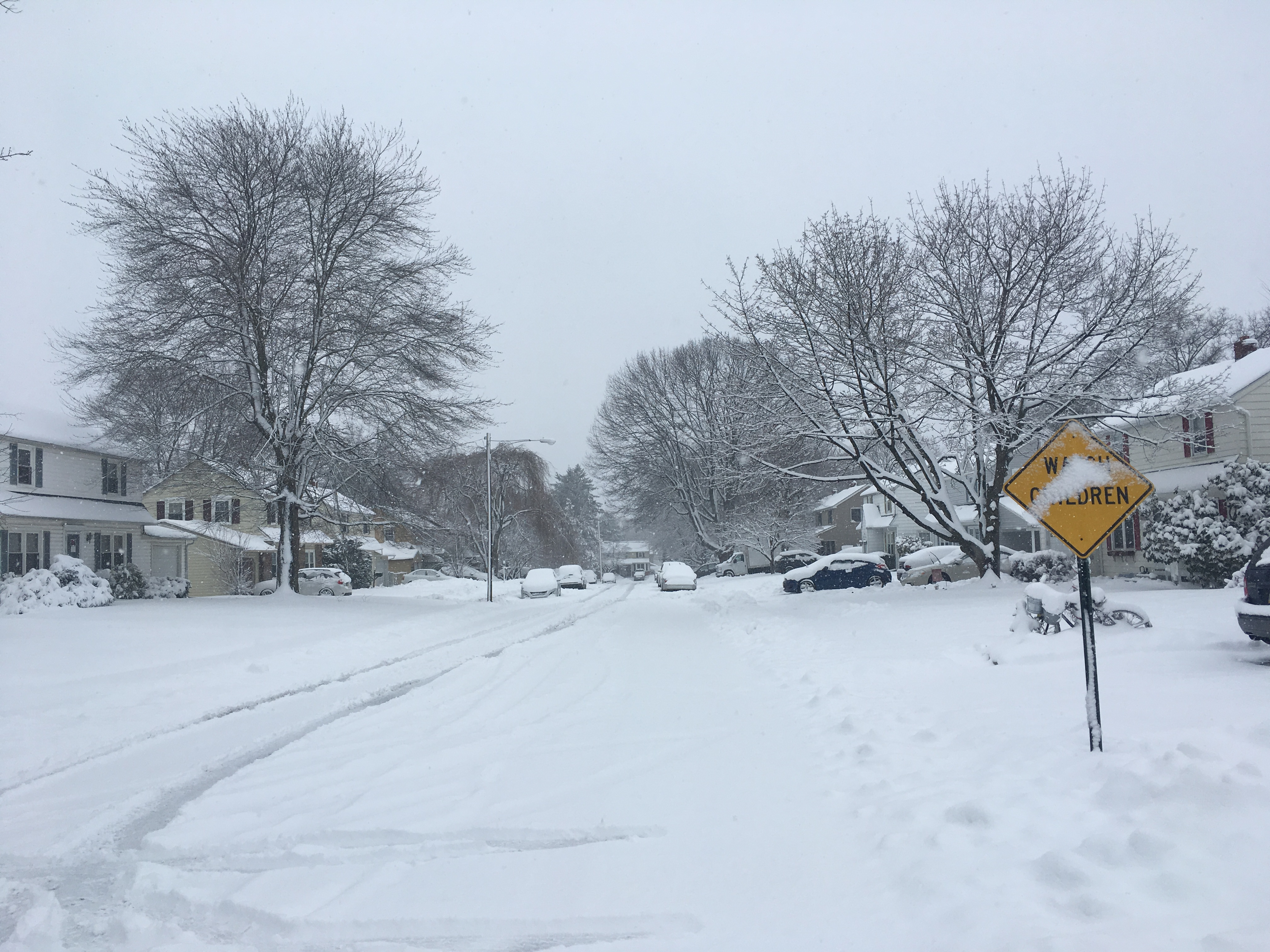
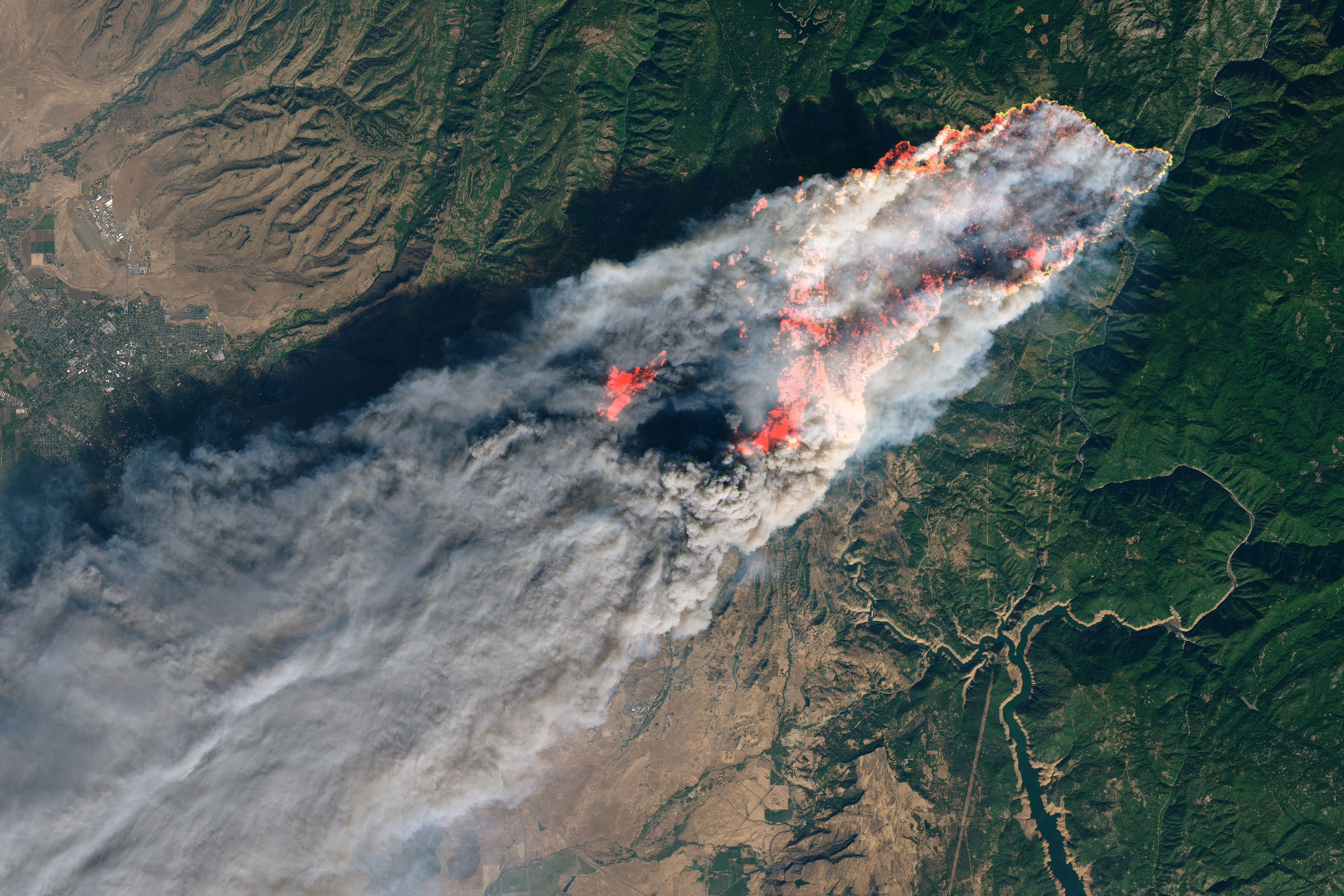
A collage of various weather events that occurred in 2018 from clockwise: five tropical cyclones simultaneously existing throughout the basins, the Camp Fire in California, and snow from a nor'easter

The following is a list of weather events that occurred in 2018.

== Summary by weather type ==
=== Winter storms and cold waves ===
A cold wave from late December 2017 persists into early January 2018. Between both years, 39 people die. Several records due to the cold are broken as a result, and the January 2018 North American blizzard is fueled. The blizzard results in 22 deaths. There is also $1.1 billion in damages. The storm was dubbed a historic bomb cyclone. Following a tranquil February, winter weather resumes in March. The March 1–3, 2018 nor'easter was the most destructive of those. Over 1.9 million people lose power,`with 9 dead and $2.25 billion in damage. another nor'easter a few days later causes 2 deaths and $525 million in damage. A final nor'easter rode up the East Coast two weeks later. It caused a tornado outbreak. This included an EF3 tornado that destroyed Jacksonville State University in Alabama. It also caused near-record spring snowfall along the Northeastern United States. Then, in April, a cold wave caused Iowa and Wisconsin to have their coldest April on record. In mid-November, a winter storm across the United States caused 11 deaths, one of the worst traffic jams in New York City, and 555 car crashes in New Jersey. A few weeks later, another blizzard kills 4 more people. After that, another winter storm caused 3 more deaths in North Carolina.

=== Floods ===
In late February 2018, the Ohio River had its highest crest since 1997. Six people died in the flooding. In late April and early May, one of the worst floods in New Brunswick history in Canada caused rivers to rise at record-breaking levels. A combination of heavy rainfall, melting snow, and very warm temperatures caused historic flooding over the St. John River, with the water level reaching 8.12 m (26.6 ft) near Fredericton. 50 roads were affected by the floods, including a 75 km (47 mi) stretch of Canada Route 105 between Fredericton and Youngs Cove. On April 29, water levels began to stabilize, but remained high at about 8 m (26 ft) near the Fredericton area.

=== Droughts, heat waves, and wildfires ===
In early February, 39.6% of the contiguous United States had drought coverage, with the worst of it being in the Southern Plains, southern Rockies and the Four Corners region. In South America, a severe lack of rainfall led to the worst drought over parts of Argentina and Uruguay, with US$3.9 billion in damage, making it the most expensive disaster in Argentina and Uruguay history. In Uruguay, the lack of rainfall led to the worst drought conditions in the nation since 2008-2009. 90 percent of German land suffered severe drought conditions, which combined with record heat between April and August, causing forest fires and crop failures. The Camp Fire in November caused 85 deaths, destroyed more than 18,000 structures, and burned 153,336 acres (62,053 ha) of land, making it the deadliest fire in California history.

=== Tornadoes ===
2018 was relatively quiet in terms of tornadoes, and for the first time in history, no EF4 or EF5 tornadoes touched down in the United States. However, the state of Connecticut saw a record number of tornadoes. The first major tornado outbreak of 2018 came on February 24. This tornado outbreak caused two deaths and 20 injuries from 30 tornadoes. This became the first tornado related death in the United States in 284 days, ending a record long streak. A few days later, a tornado outbreak strikes the United States from March 20 to 22nd. An EF3 tornado struck Jacksonville State University, causing $42 million and forcing 9,000 people to go without power. A month later, another tornado outbreak affects the United States in mid-April. An EF1 tornado in April in Louisiana caused one death. An EF2 tornado in North Carolina also caused a fatality, but an indirect one. A month later, another tornado outbreak produces an EF0 tornado in Newburgh, New York that results in a death. The storm itself causes 5 more deaths as a result of straight-line winds. Before that, on May 14, the storm also produced tornadoes across Kansas.

On June 12, an F4 tornado touches down in Brazil, killing two. On July 10, another fatal EF2 touched down in Minot, North Dakota. One newborn baby is killed and 28 others are injured. Nine days later, destructive tornadoes tore across Iowa, causing $320 million in damage, and 37 injuries. It also fuels the Table Rock Lake duck boat accident, which kills 17 and injures 7 in Missouri. On August 3, an EF4 touched down in Manitoba, becoming North America's only violent tornado of the year, and killing one person. The remnants of Hurricane Florence spawned a fatal tornado in Virginia. The tornado outbreak as a whole spawned 37 other tornadoes. Just a few days later, the 2018 United States–Canada tornado outbreak causes damage in the Midwestern United States and especially in Ontario and Quebec. Before crossing into Canada, Minnesota had its third most prolific tornado day on record. 300,000 customers in the Ottawa area lost power. The tornadoes cause $295 million in damage and injure 31.

In late October and early November, another tornado outbreak occurs, spawning 61 tornadoes. There is one indirect death due to an EF1 in Mississippi, and two direct deaths due to an EF1 tornado in Maryland. Just a few days later, another fatal tornado touches down in Tennessee. A tornado outbreak then started at the end of the month and continued into December, which spawned 49 tornadoes, including an EF3 in Illinois that injured 22. Another tornado death occurs due to an EF1 in Missouri. Two weeks later, the 2018 Port Orchard tornado touches down in Port Orchard, Washington. The tornado caused $1.81 million in damage. Finally, on December 31, a child dies in a tornado in Indonesia.

=== Tropical cyclones ===
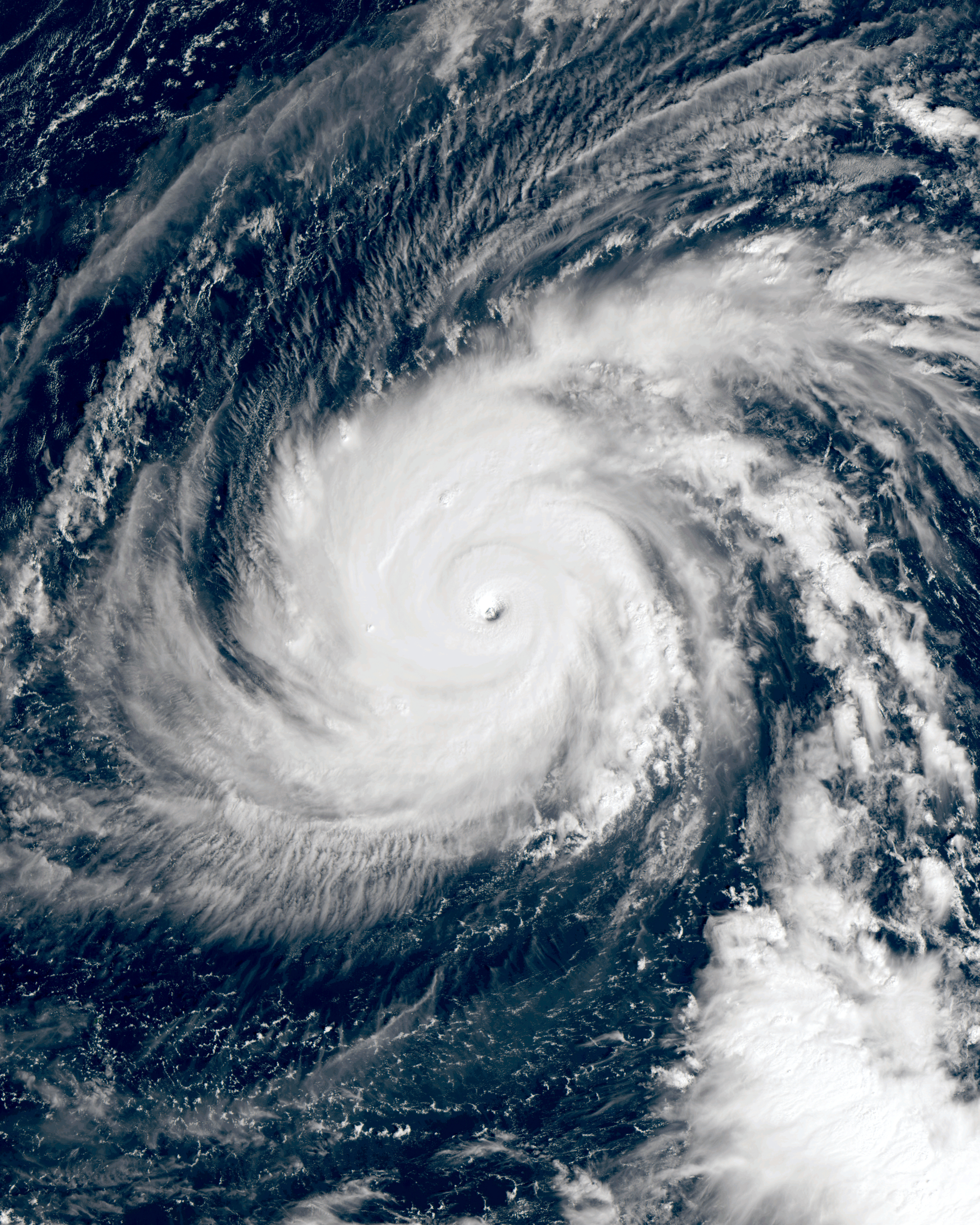
Typhoon Yutu at peak intensity over the Northern Marianas Islands

As the year began, a tropical depression was moving across the Philippines, and Cyclone Ava was developing northeast of Madagascar. Ava caused at least 51 deaths and US$195 million in damage, and was followed by 13 additional tropical cyclones in the south-west Indian Ocean. In the Australian region, there were 27 tropical cyclones, including Cyclone Marcus, a powerful cyclone that caused US$75 million in damage in Western Australia. In the South Pacific Ocean, there were 15 tropical cyclones during the year, including Cyclone Gita, the most intense tropical cyclone to impact Tonga since reliable records began.

In the northern hemisphere, the western Pacific Ocean was active, with 44 tropical cyclones. The strongest typhoons were Kong-rey and Yutu, which both had 10 minute sustained winds of 215 km/h (130 mph) and a minimum pressure of 900 mbar (27 inHg). In October, Yutu struck Tinian in the Northern Marianas Islands at peak intensity, making it the strongest storm on record to hit the island chain. When Typhoon Jebi struck Japan in September, insured damage totaled around US$15 billion, making it the country's costliest ever typhoon. In July, Tropical Storm Son-Tinh killed more than 200 people when it moved through the Philippines, China, and Vietnam, mostly related to a dam collapse in Laos. In December, Tropical Depression Usman moved through the Philippines, killing 156 people and leaving ₱5.41 billion (US$103 million) in damage. In the north Indian Ocean, there were 14 tropical cyclones, several of which affected land. In May, Cyclone Sagar killed 79 people when it struck Somaliland in the Horn of Africa. Cyclone Mekunu caused US$1.5 billion in damage and 31 deaths when it struck Oman. Cyclone Titli killed 85 people when it struck southeastern India in October.

The north-east Pacific Ocean was active, with three Category 5 hurricanes on the Saffir-Simpson scale – Lane, Walaka, and Willa. Lane in August was the wettest on record in Hawaii, with peak rainfall accumulations of 58 inches (1,473 mm) causing US$250 million in damage. In October, Walaka affected the Northwestern Hawaiian Islands, and Willa struck southwestern Mexico, causing nine deaths and US$825 million in damage. The Atlantic Ocean featured 16 tropical cyclones, including Hurricane Michael in October, one of only four Category 5 hurricanes to hit the United States at that intensity. Michael struck the Florida panhandle and caused US$25.5 billion in damage as well as 74 deaths. In September, Hurricane Florence caused widespread flooding after setting state precipitation records in North and South Carolina, resulting in US$24 billion in damage and 52 fatalities.

In addition to the officially tracked storms, there was a Mediterranean tropical-like cyclone named Cyclone Zorbas, which struck Greece.

== Timeline ==
This is a timeline of weather events during 2018. Please note that entries might cross between months, however, all entries are listed by the month it started, except for the December 2017–January 2018 North American cold wave, which was ongoing when 2018 began.

=== January ===
- December 23, 2017 – January 19, 2018 – A cold wave caused damaging low temperatures across eastern North America. The cold wave also caused Tallahassee, Florida to receive trace amounts of frozen precipitation for the first time in more than 30 years.
- December 29, 2017 – January 4, 2018 – Tropical Storm Bolaven forms east of Palau. The storm struck the southern portion of the Philippines, where it killed 4 people in total and left ₱554.7 million (US$10.53 million) of damage, before dissipating off the South Central Coast of Vietnam.
- January 2–6 – A cyclonic blizzard across North America killed 22 people, caused at least 300,000 power outages, and caused $1.1 billion (2018 USD) in damage across Cuba, The Bahamas, Bermuda, the Southeastern United States, the Northeastern United States, New England, and Atlantic Canada. The storm received various unofficial names, such as Winter Storm Grayson, Blizzard of 2018 and Storm Brody. The storm was also dubbed a "historic bomb cyclone".
- January 8- A severe cold wave hit Bangladesh and Bangladesh register lowest ever recorded temperature in independent Bangladesh history in tetulia upzila in panchagarh district in Rangpur Division a temperature about 2.60°C on 8:38 am in local time.
- January 9 – A series of mudflows in Southern California killed 23 people, injured 163 others, and caused $207 million (2018 USD) in damage.
- January 11–24 – Cyclone Berguitta kills two people with one missing and caused over US$107 million in damage across Mauritius and Réunion.
- January 14–16 – Tropical Depression 04 kills 11 people and caused $5.1 million (2018 USD) in damage across Madagascar and Mozambique.
- January 28–30 - Cyclone Fehi caused extensive damage as an extratropical cyclone in Western New Zealand. Insurance loss were amounted at NZ$38.5 million (US$28.5 million).

=== February ===
- February 3–22 – Cyclone Gita kills 3 people (One presumed) and caused at least $252.8 million (2018 USD) in damage across Vanuatu, Fiji, Wallis and Futuna, Samoa, American Samoa, Cook Islands, Niue, Tonga, New Caledonia, Queensland, and New Zealand. Cyclone Gita was the most intense tropical cyclone to impact Tonga since reliable records began.
- February 8–16 – Tropical Storm Sanba, known in the Philippines as Tropical Storm Basyang, kills 15 people and caused $3.23 million (2018 USD) in damage across the Caroline Islands and the Philippines.
- February 11–21 – Cyclone Kelvin caused $25 million (2018 USD) in damage across the Northern Territory, Western Australia and South Australia.
- February 24 – A tornado outbreak causes 2 deaths and 20 injuries from 30 tornadoes.

=== March ===
- March 1–5 – A nor'easter bomb cyclone and winter storm, unofficially named Winter Storm Riley by The Weather Channel, killed nine people, caused over 1.9 million power outages, and caused $2.25 billion (2018 United States Dollar) in damage across the Northeastern United States and Canada.
- March 2–9 – A nor'easter and blizzard, unofficially named Winter Storm Quinn by The Weather Channel, killed two people, caused over 1 million power outages, and caused $525 million (2018 USD) in damage across the Northeastern United States and Canada.
- March 2–10 – Cyclone Dumazile kills two people and caused damage across Madagascar and Réunion.
- March 3–13 – Cyclone Hola kills three people and caused damage across Vanuatu, New Caledonia, and New Zealand.
- March 14–22 – Tropical Storm Eliakim kills 21 people and caused $3.21 million (2018 USD) in damage across Madagascar, Réunion, Mayotte, Tromelin Island, Mauritius, and Kenya.
- March 14–27 – Cyclone Marcus caused $75 million (2018 USD) in damage across Western Australia and Australia's Northern Territory. Cyclone Marcus was also considered the worst cyclone to hit Darwin since 1974.
- March 18–24 – A nor'easter winter storm and tornado outbreak, dubbed by the media as the Four'easter and unofficially named Winter Storm Toby and Nor'easter 4 by The Weather Channel killed four people, caused over 100,000 power outages, and caused $900 million (2018 USD) in damage across the United States. The storm spawned 20 tornadoes, with one being an EF3 that impacted Jacksonville State University. The tornadoes injured 7 people.
- March 29 – April 2 – Cyclone Josie kills six people and caused $10 million (2018 USD) in damage across Vanuatu, Fiji, and Tonga.

=== April ===
- April 13–15 – A tornado outbreak combined with a blizzard (Winter Storm Xanto) kills four people (1 tornadic (+1 indirect and 3 winter storm), injured 29 others, and caused $925 million (2018 USD) in damage across the United States and Eastern Canada with a total of 73 confirmed tornadoes.
- April 22–26 – Cyclone Fakir kills two people and caused over 17.7 million (2018 USD) in damage across Mauritius and Réunion.

=== May ===
- May 14–15 – A tornado outbreak in the Great Plains and Northeastern United States kills six people (1 tornadic and 5 straight-line winds) from 24 tornadoes.
- May 16–20 – Cyclone Sagar kills 79 people and caused $30 million (2018 USD) in damage across Yemen, Somalia, Somaliland, Djibouti, and Ethiopia. Cyclone Sagar was the strongest tropical cyclone to make landfall in Somalia and Somaliland in recorded history until 2020.
- May 21–27 – Cyclone Mekunu kills 31 people and caused $1.5 billion (2018 USD) in damage across Yemen, Oman, and Saudi Arabia. Cyclone Mekunu was the strongest storm to strike Oman's Dhofar Governorate since 1959.
- May 25–June 1 – Tropical Storm Alberto kills 18 people and caused $125 million (2018 USD) in damage across the Yucatán Peninsula, Cuba, the Eastern United States, and Canada.
- May 27 – A flood in Maryland killed one person, which prompted Governor Larry Hogan declared a state of emergency.

=== June ===
- June 2–11 – Tropical Storm Ewiniar kills 14 people and caused $749 million (2018 USD) in damage across the Philippines, Vietnam, South China, Taiwan, and the Ryukyu Islands.
- June 3–13 – Tropical Storm Maliksi kills two people and caused damage across the Philippines and Japan.
- June 9–16 – Hurricane Bud kills two people and caused $167,000 (2018 USD) in damage across the Baja California Peninsula, Northwestern Mexico, Southwestern United States, and Wyoming.
- June 12 – A violent F4 tornado in Brazil killed two people and caused damage across Rio Grande do Sul, Brazil.
- June 14–19 – Tropical Storm Carlotta kills three people and caused $7.6 million (2018 USD) in damage across Central and Southern Mexico.
- June 28 – An EF0 anticyclonic tornado touches down in Montana.
- June 28 – July 5 – Typhoon Prapiroon kills four people and caused $10.1 million (2018 USD) in damage across Japan and the Korean Peninsula.

=== July ===
- July 3–12 – Typhoon Maria, known in the Philippines as Typhoon Gardo, kills two people and caused $628 million (2018 USD) in damage across the Mariana Islands, the Ryukyu Islands, Taiwan, and China.
- July 4–17 – Hurricane Beryl caused over $1 million (2018 USD) in damage and caused 47,000 power outages across the Caribbean, the United States Virgin Islands, Puerto Rico, Hispaniola, Lucayan Archipelago, Bermuda, and Atlantic Canada.
- July 6–17 – Hurricane Chris kills one person and caused damage across the East Coast of the United States, Bermuda, Atlantic Canada, and Iceland.
- July 10 – An EF2 tornado in North Dakota kills one person and injured 28 others.
- July 15–24 – Tropical Storm Son-Tinh, known in the Philippines as Tropical Storm Henry, kills 173 people with over 1,100 missing and caused $323 million (2018 USD) in damage across the Philippines, South China, Vietnam, Laos, Thailand, and Myanmar.
- July 17–26 – Tropical Storm Ampil, known in the Philippines as Severe Tropical Storm Inday, kills one person and caused $241 million (2018 USD) in damage across the Ryukyu Islands and East and Northeast China.
- July 20–23 – Tropical Depression Josie kills 16 people and caused $87.4 million (2018 USD) in damage across the Philippines and Taiwan.
- July 19–20 - A tornado outbreak, mainly in Iowa, causes 37 injuries and $320 million from 31 tornadoes. It also caused the Table Rock Lake duck boat accident to sink, which killed 17 people and injured 7 others.
- July 23 – August 4 – Typhoon Jongdari caused $1.46 billion (2018 USD) in damage across Japan and East China after becoming the fourth tropical cyclone since 1951 to approach Honshu on a westward trajectory.
- July 31 – August 16 – Hurricane Hector caused damage across Hawaii and Johnston Atoll.

=== August ===
- August 2–10 – Typhoon Shanshan caused $866,000 (2018 USD) in damage across the Mariana Islands and Japan.
- August 3 – A violent EF4 tornado in Manitoba, Canada kills one person and injured two others. The tornado was the first (and only) violent tornado in North America during 2018, destroying parts of Alonsa, Manitoba Canada. It also causes $2 million in damage.
- August 4–7 – Tropical Storm Ileana killed eight people and caused damage across Western Mexico.
- August 6–16 – Tropical Storm Yagi killed seven people and caused $365 million (2018 USD) in damage across China, Taiwan, the Philippines, and Korea.
- August 31–September 18 – Hurricane Florence killed 54 people (24 direct and 30 indirect) and caused $24.23 billion (2018 USD) in damage across West Africa, Cape Verde, Bermuda, the East Coast of the United States (especially the Carolinas), and Atlantic Canada.

=== September ===
- September 3–8 – Tropical Storm Gordon killed four people (3 direct and 1 indirect) and caused over $200 million (2018 USD) in damage across Hispaniola, Cuba, The Bahamas, South Florida, the Florida Keys, the Gulf Coast of the United States, Arkansas, Missouri, the United States East Coast, and Southern Ontario.
- September 17 – An EF2 tornado in Virginia associated with Hurricane Florence kills one person, injured 16 people, and caused significant damage in the Midlothian, Virginia area.
- September 20–21 – A tornado outbreak in the United States and Canada kills one person (non-tornadic) and injured 31 others from 37 tornadoes across Ohio, Iowa, Minnesota, Wisconsin, eastern Ontario, and southern Quebec. The storm caused over 300,000 power outages in Ontario, Canada.

=== October ===
- October 7–16 – Hurricane Michael kills 74 people (31 direct and 43 indirect) and caused $25.5 billion (2018 USD) in damage across Central America, Yucatán Peninsula, Cayman Islands, Cuba, the Southeastern United States (especially the Florida Panhandle and Georgia), the Eastern United States, Eastern Canada, and the Iberian Peninsula.
- October 31 - November 2 - A tornado outbreak causes two direct deaths and another indirect one from 61 tornadoes.

=== November ===
- November 6 – An EF2 tornado in Tennessee kills one person and injured two others.
- November 8–25 - The Camp Fire, across northern California, killed 85 people with one missing, injured 17 others, and caused $16.65 billion (2018 USD) in damage, becoming the costliest wildfire on record.
- November 23 - A monthly low temperature record is set in two cities in New York. Syracuse saw a low of −1 °F (−18 °C) and Binghamton saw a record low of 0 °F (−18 °C). Several other cities saw daily record lows set. Bridgeport, Connecticut also set a record for coldest November day with a low of 13 °F (−11 °C).
- November 30 – A high-end F1 tornado in Brazil kills two people.
- November 30 – December 2 – A tornado outbreak across the United States kills one person and injured 32 others from 49 tornadoes. This outbreak was the largest December tornado event on record in Illinois history.

=== December ===
- December 18 – A rare EF2 tornado hits Port Orchard, Washington and caused $1.81 million (2018 USD) in damage and became the strongest tornado in Washington since 1986.
- December 31 – A tornado in Indonesia killed one person.

== See also ==
- Weather of 2020

Global weather by year
Preceded by 2017	Weather of 2018	Succeeded by 2019
