= Tropical Storm Son-Tinh (2018) =

Pacific tropical storm in 2018

Tropical Storm Son-Tinh (Henry)
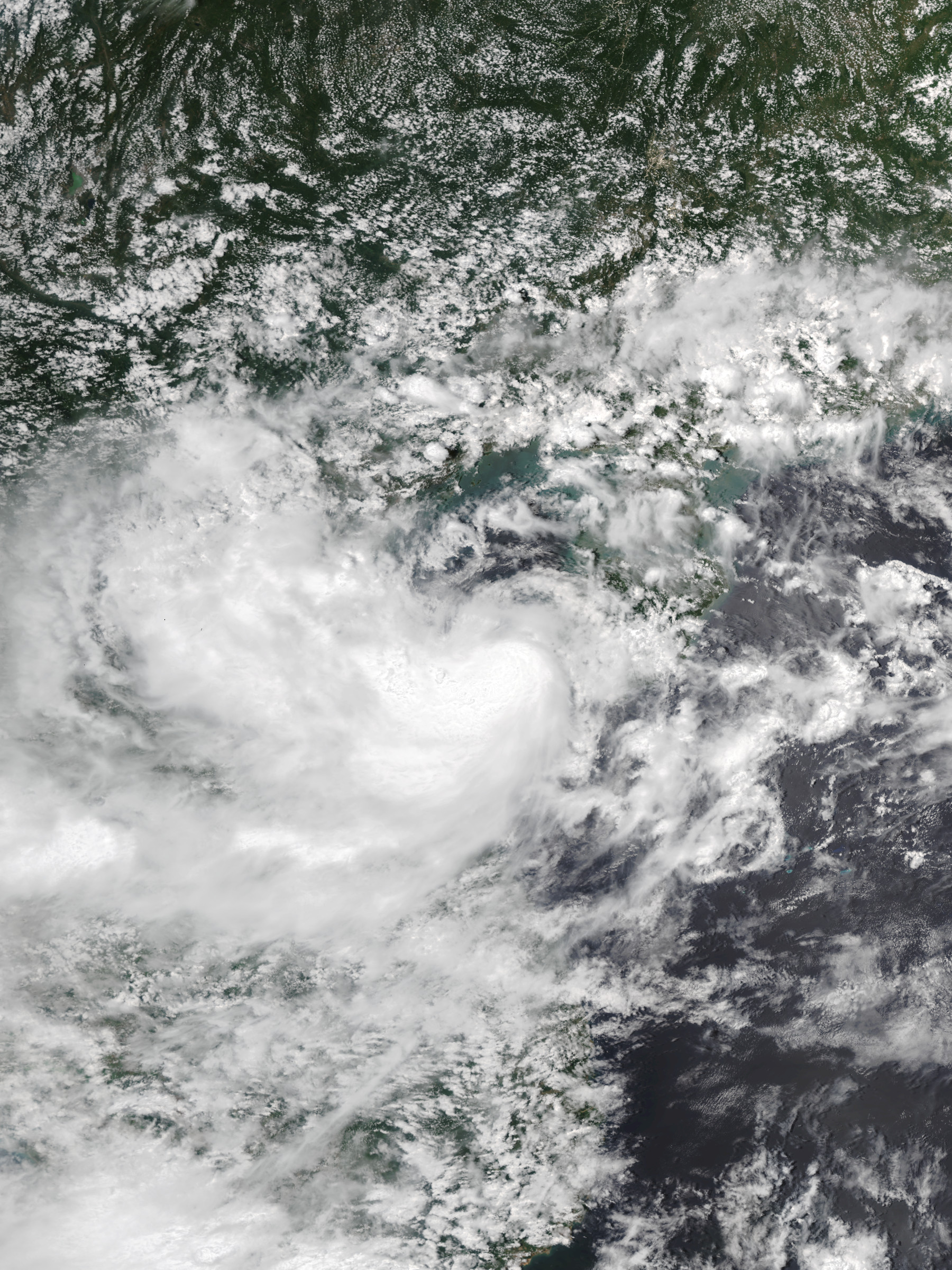
- Son-Tinh at near peak intensity while approaching Vietnam on July 18

Meteorological history
- Formed: July 15, 2018 (re-generated on July 21)
- Dissipated: July 24, 2018

Tropical storm
- 10-minute sustained (JMA)
- Highest winds: 75 km/h (45 mph)
- Lowest pressure: 994 hPa (mbar); 29.35 inHg

Tropical storm
- 1-minute sustained (SSHWS/JTWC)
- Highest winds: 95 km/h (60 mph)
- Lowest pressure: 989 hPa (mbar); 29.21 inHg

Overall effects
- Fatalities: 173
- Missing: possibly 1,100
- Damage: $323 million (2018 USD)
- Areas affected: Philippines, South China, Vietnam, Laos, Thailand, Myanmar
- IBTrACS
- Part of the 2018 Pacific typhoon season

Tropical Storm Son-Tinh, (Note: The name Son-Tinh (Vietnamese: Sơn Tinh, [səːn˧˧ tïŋ˧˧]) was contributed by Vietnam and refers to Tản Viên Sơn Thánh, the god of the Ba Vì mountain range, in Vietnamese.) known in the Philippines as Tropical Storm Henry, was a weak, erratic but very deadly tropical cyclone that devastated Vietnam and Laos in mid-July 2018. Son-Tinh originated from an area of low pressure over the Philippine Sea on July 15, 2018. Moving quickly westwards, Son-Tinh strengthened to the ninth tropical storm of the annual typhoon season on July 17. Intensifying only slightly while crossing the South China Sea, Son-Tinh made its first landfall over Hainan Island on July 18. After emerging into the Gulf of Tonkin, Son-Tinh restrengthened before making its second landfall as a tropical storm in Northern Vietnam on July 19. Once inland, Son-Tinh weakened into a low pressure area as it slowed and made a clockwise loop. The remnants of Son-Tinh then emerged back over water and regenerated into a tropical depression late on July 21.

The storm caused severe floods and mudslides in Vietnam, leading to the death of at least 32 people. Over 82,000 hectares (200,000 acres) of agricultural land was inundated and at least 17,000 farm animals were swept away by the floods. The storm also caused or related to the havoc in the neighbouring country of Laos with the collapse of Attapeu dam, in which 40 people died and 98 more missing (and probably as much as 1,100 more people are missing) and 6,600 more are displaced.

== Meteorological history ==
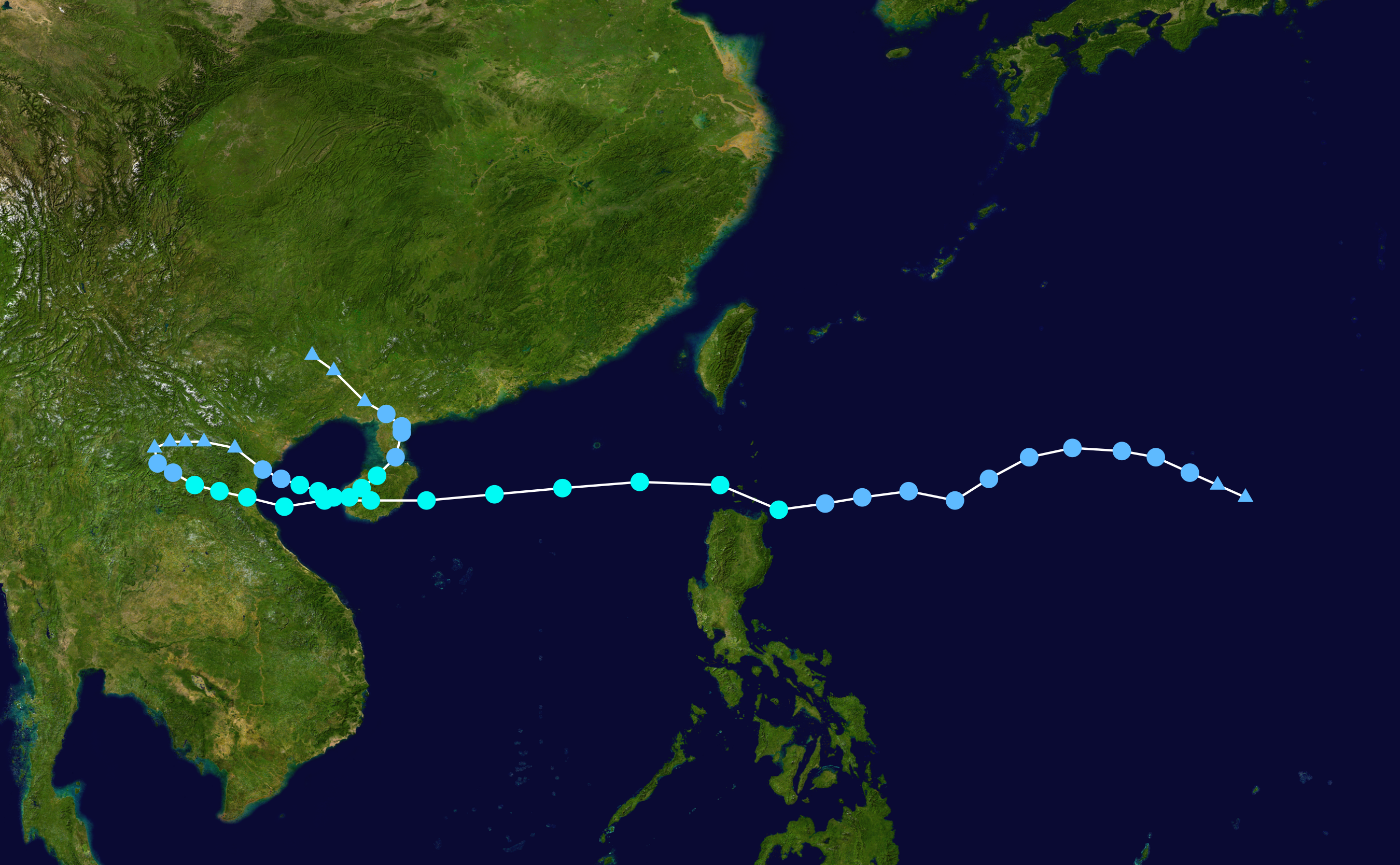
Map plotting the storm's track and intensity, according to the Saffir–Simpson scale Map key Saffir–Simpson scale Tropical depression (≤38 mph, ≤62 km/h) Tropical storm (39–73 mph, 63–118 km/h) Category 1 (74–95 mph, 119–153 km/h) Category 2 (96–110 mph, 154–177 km/h) Category 3 (111–129 mph, 178–208 km/h) Category 4 (130–156 mph, 209–251 km/h) Category 5 (≥157 mph, ≥252 km/h) Unknown Storm type Tropical cyclone Subtropical cyclone Extratropical cyclone, remnant low, tropical disturbance, or monsoon depression

An area of low pressure strengthened into a tropical depression on July 15, to the northwest of Manila, Philippines. Accordingly, the Joint Typhoon Warning Center (JTWC) designated it as 11W while the Philippine Atmospheric, Geophysical and Astronomical Services Administration (PAGASA) gave it the local name Henry. As the system moved westward at high speed, it gradually intensified as its convective structure improved, and strengthened a tropical storm by July 17, with the Japan Meteorological Agency (JMA) assigning the system the international name Son-Tinh.

Thereafter, however, Son-Tinh weakened slightly as it neared Hainan island due to moderate vertical wind shear. Continuing to struggle to maintain intensity amid increasing wind shear, Son-Tinh crossed over Hainan island at around 03:00 UTC on July 18; despite land interaction the system continued to maintain its overall convective organization. Later that day, as Son-Tinh emerged from land into the Gulf of Tonkin, Son-Tinh managed to intensify over the warm waters, with sea surface temperatures of over 28 °C (82 °F) contributing to offset otherwise unfavorable upper atmospheric conditions. Before making landfall in Northern Vietnam, the JMA reported that Son-Tinh reached peak intensity with 10-minute sustained winds of 75 km/h (45 mph) and a central pressure of 994 hPa (29.4 inHg). Once inland over Northern Vietnam, Son-Tinh began to weaken quickly. Both the JMA and the JTWC issued their final warnings on Son-Tinh on July 19 as the system degenerated into an area of low pressure embedded in the monsoon. The JTWC, however, continued to track Son-Tinh's remnants for the next two days.

Through July 19 and 20, Son-Tinh's remnants curved northwards and then eastwards over Northern Vietnam, before moving southeastward back into the Gulf of Tonkin on July 21. Persistent convection developed over the system, aided by a tropical upper tropospheric trough to the northeast, prompting the JTWC to begin issuing advisories on Son-Tinh once again on July 21. Simultaneously the JMA reported that Son-Tinh had regenerated into a tropical depression. With vertical wind shear now low and sea surface temperatures remaining high near 29 °C (84 °F), the JTWC stated that Son-Tinh intensified back into a tropical storm on July 22, while the JMA continued to maintain Son-Tinh as a tropical depression.

The lowest atmospheric pressure recorded at Quỳnh Lưu Station, Nghệ An Province, during the storm was 990.4 hPa (29.25 inHg).

== Preparations and impact ==
=== China ===
Total economic loss nationwide were at ¥240 million (US$35.7 million).

=== Vietnam ===
On July 18, the Vietnamese government ordered all vessels to return to port.

The strongest sustained wind observed over land in Vietnam due to the impact of the storm was 50 km/h, recorded at a weather station in Quỳnh Lưu.

In Vietnam, the Thanh Hóa and Nghệ An provinces suffered the most damage, especially with the wake of the storm continuing to generate significant rainfall. It caused major flooding in Northern Vietnam and the capital city of Hanoi. 35 people were killed, more than 5,000 houses, 82,000 hectares (200,000 acres) of crops, and 17,000 farm animals were either swept away, submerged, or otherwise destroyed. The storm has cut off access to several areas in the country and flood water covers several streets in the capital city. Economic losses were estimated to be ₫6.615 trillion (US$287 million).

=== Laos ===
On July 23, a hydroelectric dam under construction in Attapeu Province, south-east Laos, collapsed. As of September 25, 40 people were confirmed dead, at least 98 more were missing (and probably as much as 1,100 more people are missing) and 6,600 others were displaced.

== See also ==
- Weather of 2018
- Tropical cyclones in 2018
- Typhoon Nina (1975) – devastating tropical cyclone in which most of the effects are located in the collapse of a dam
- Tropical Storm Amy (1994)
- Tropical Storm Linda (1997) – similarly deadly tropical cyclone to the south where Son-Tinh hit.
- Tropical Storm Soudelor (2009)
- 2011 Southeast Asian floods
- Typhoon Son-Tinh (2012) – storm with the same name that impacted the same area in 2012.
- Tropical Storm Aere (2016)
- Tropical Storm Sonca (2017) – another cyclone with similar track and floods, especially affecting Northeast Thailand (Sakon Nakhon Province).
- October 2017 Vietnam tropical depression – another deadly cyclone with similar landfalling point and floods, this time affecting the Central Vietnam.
- Tropical Storm Bebinca (2018) - another storm that made landfall at the same area.
- Tropical Storm Nangka (2020) - a tropical storm that contributed the 2020 Central Vietnam floods
- Tropical Storm Kompasu (2021)
