= Basiao Island =

Island in the Philippines

Coordinates: 11°41′26.3″N 124°54′3.87″E

Basiao Island is an island in Catbalogan, Samar, Philippines. It is composed of three islets interconnected through basal karst and coastal carbonate calcium carbonate brought about by continuous diastrophism. It faces Majaba Island on the northwest direction of the islet while the opposite headland side faces the southern part of Catbalogan, approximately three nautical miles. Basiao, as an island barangay, is one of 57 barangays of Catbalogan, the capital of Samar Province.

Basiao Island Beach, formally known as Aba-Aba Island Park, is located within Barangay Basiao.

Basiao Island has the potential as a coral garden, marina or marine resort with activities ideal for diving, snorkeling, sailing, sport fishing, kayaking and other water sports. Aside from its strategic location, the island is endowed with rich resources such as wide diversity of molluscs (such as Leptopoma nitidum basiaoensis), reptiles, fish, crustaceans and other marine invertebrates such as exotic seahorse, crabs, grouper and many more species. The island is also home to birds such as the Purple-throated sunbird, the flowerpecker Dicaeum papuense and Cyrtostomus julgaris julgaris. Unique to the island is the Aba-Aba, a shellfish found only in the cluster islands of Basiao and Buad, thus the former name Aba-Aba Island Park.
