= 2018 Pacific hurricane season =

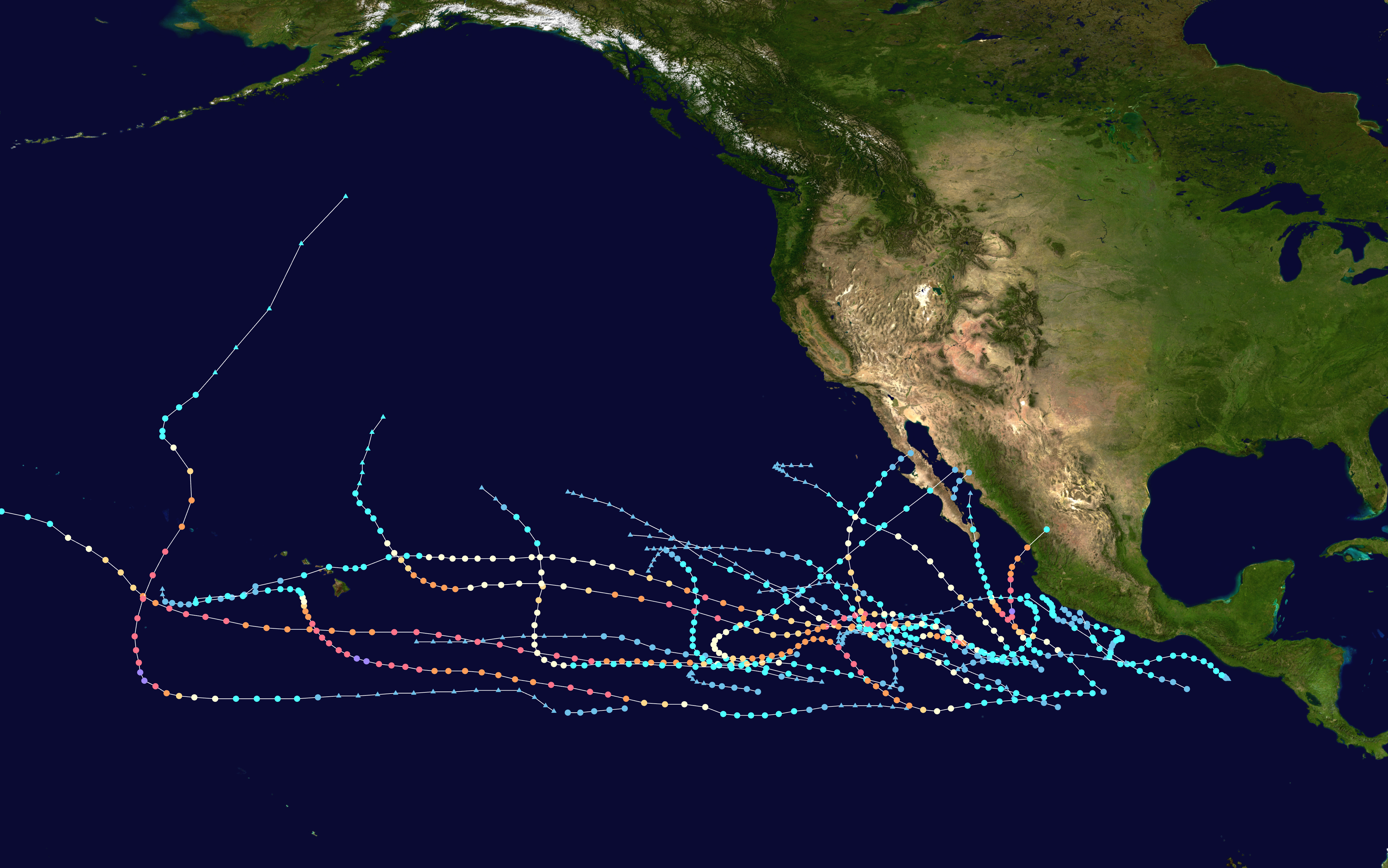
- Season summary map

Seasonal boundaries
- First system formed: May 10, 2018
- Last system dissipated: November 5, 2018

Strongest storm
- Name: Walaka
  - Maximum winds: 160 mph (260 km/h) (1-minute sustained)
  - Lowest pressure: 921 mbar (hPa; 27.2 inHg)

Seasonal statistics
- Total depressions: 26 official, 1 unofficial
- Total storms: 23 official, 1 unofficial
- Hurricanes: 13
- Major hurricanes (Cat. 3+): 10
- ACE: 318.1 (second-highest on record)
- Total fatalities: 59 total
- Total damage: > $1.64 billion (2018 USD)

Related articles
- Timeline of the 2018 Pacific hurricane season; 2018 Atlantic hurricane season; 2018 Pacific typhoon season; 2018 North Indian Ocean cyclone season

The 2018 Pacific hurricane season was one of the most active Pacific hurricane seasons on record, producing the highest accumulated cyclone energy value in the basin at the time until it was surpassed in 2026. It also had the fourth-highest number of named storms – 23, tied with 1982. (Note: An average Pacific hurricane season, as defined by the National Oceanic and Atmospheric Administration, has fifteen tropical storms, seven hurricanes and three major hurricanes.) The season also featured eight landfalls, six of which occurred in Mexico. The season officially began on May 15 in the Eastern Pacific, and on June 1 in the Central Pacific; they both ended on November 30. These dates conventionally delimit the period of each year when most tropical cyclones form in the Pacific basin. However, tropical cyclone formation is possible at any time of the year, as illustrated when the first tropical depression formed on May 10, five days prior to the official start of the season.

The second named storm of the season, Hurricane Bud, struck Baja California Sur in mid-June, causing minor damage. Tropical Storm Carlotta stalled offshore of the Mexican coastline, where it also caused minor damage. In early August, Hurricane Hector became one of the few tropical cyclones to cross into the Western Pacific from the Eastern Pacific, while also affecting Hawaii. Tropical Storm Ileana brought torrential rainfall to southwestern Mexico during early August, causing relatively minor damage. A few weeks later, Hurricane Lane obtained Category 5 (Note: Hurricanes reaching Category 3 (111 miles per hour or 179 kilometers per hour) and higher on the five-level Saffir–Simpson wind speed scale are considered major hurricanes.) intensity while also becoming Hawaii's wettest tropical cyclone on record and the second wettest tropical cyclone in United States history, only behind Hurricane Harvey of the previous year. Hurricane Olivia also struck Hawaii, resulting in relatively minor damage.

In late September, hurricanes Rosa and Sergio formed, both of which eventually brought thunderstorms and flash flooding to the Baja California Peninsula and the Southwestern United States. Tropical Depression Nineteen-E became the first tropical cyclone to form in the Gulf of California before it brought severe flooding to Sinaloa, Mexico, causing significant damage. Meanwhile, Hurricane Walaka attained Category 5 intensity before causing disruptions in the Northwestern Hawaiian Islands. In late October, Hurricane Willa became the record-tying third Category 5 hurricane of the season (tied with the 1994, 2002 and 2026 seasons ) before striking Sinaloa as a major hurricane, causing severe damage. Tropical Storm Vicente simultaneously affected the region just south of where Willa made landfall, causing severe flooding and dozens of landslides. Altogether, six systems made landfall this season. Damage across the basin reached $1.64 billion (2018 USD), (Note: All damage totals are valued as of 2018 and in United States dollars, unless otherwise noted.) while 57 people were killed by the various storms.

== Seasonal forecasts ==
| Record | | Named storms | Hurricanes | Major hurricanes | Ref |
|---|---|---|---|---|---|
| Average (1981–2010): | | 15.4 | 7.6 | 3.2 | |
| Record high activity: | | 1992: 27 | 2015: 16 | 2015: 11 | |
| Record low activity: | | 2010: 8 | 2010: 3 | 2003: 0 | |
| Date | Source | Named storms | Hurricanes | Major hurricanes | Ref |
| May 24, 2018 | NOAA | 14–20 | 7–12 | 3–7 | |
| May 25, 2018 | SMN | 18 | 6 | 4 | |
| | Area | Named storms | Hurricanes | Major hurricanes | Ref |
| Actual activity: | EPAC | 22 | 12 | 9 | |
| Actual activity: | CPAC | 1 | 1 | 1 | |
| Actual activity: | | 23 | 13 | 10 | |

The National Oceanic and Atmospheric Administration (NOAA) released its annual forecast on May 24, 2018, predicting an 80% chance of a near- to above-average season in both the Eastern and Central Pacific basins, with a total of 14–20 named storms, 7–12 hurricanes, and 3–7 major hurricanes. The reason for their outlook was the possible development of an El Niño, which reduces vertical wind shear across the basin and increases sea surface temperatures. In addition, many global computer models expected a positive Pacific decadal oscillation (PDO) that had been ongoing since 2014 to continue. PDO is a phase of a multi-decade cycle that favors much warmer than average sea surface temperatures, which is in contrast to the 1995–2013 period, which featured below-normal activity. The Servicio Meteorológico Nacional (SMN) issued its first forecast for the season on May 25, predicting a total of 18 named storms, 6 hurricanes, and 4 major hurricanes to develop.

== Seasonal summary ==
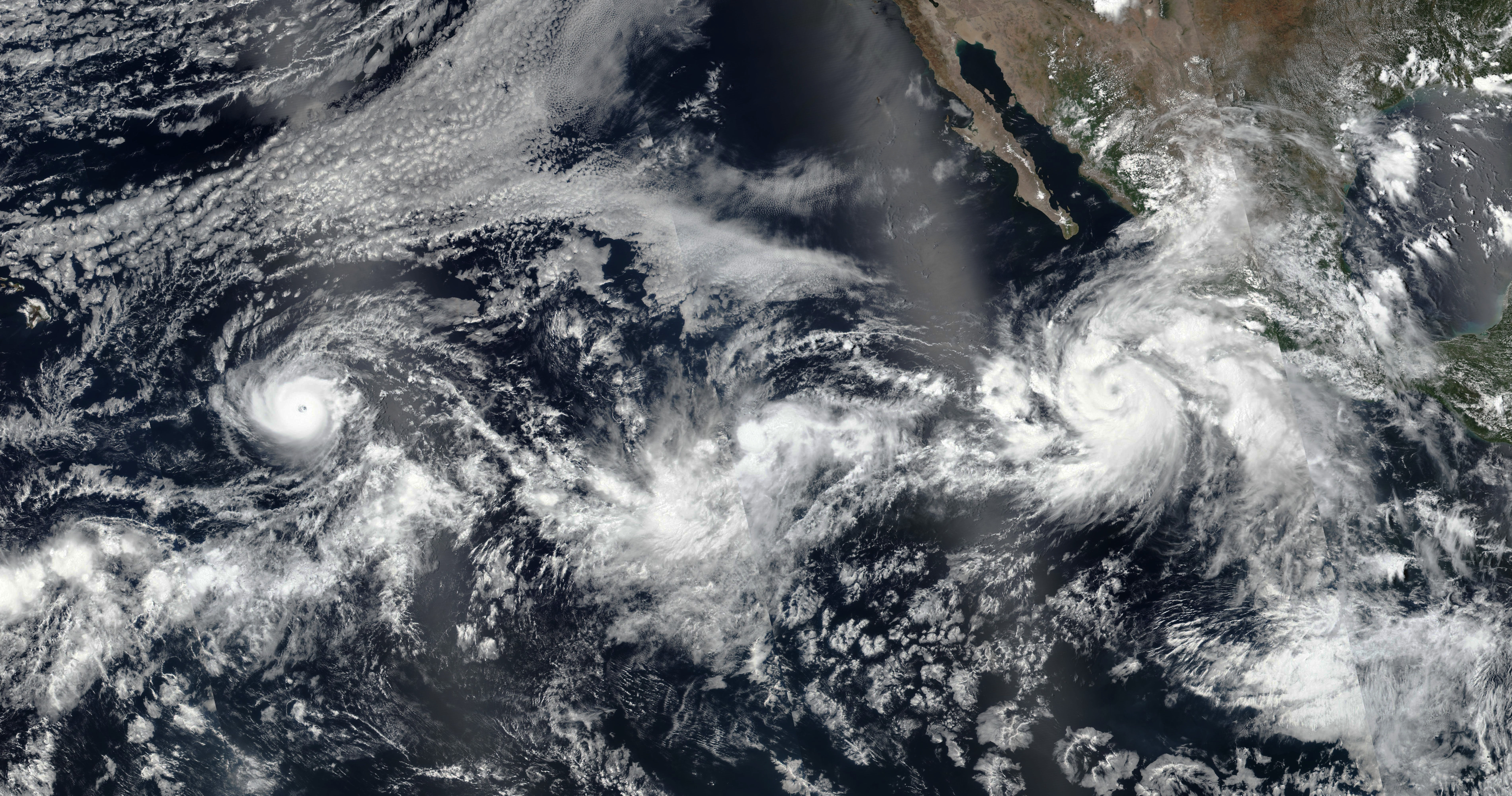
Four tropical cyclones active on August 7: Hector (left), Kristy (middle), John (right), and Ileana (merging with John on the right).

The accumulated cyclone energy (ACE) index for the 2018 Pacific hurricane season as calculated by the National Hurricane Center was 318.1 units, the second-highest total ACE of any Pacific hurricane season on record. (Note: The total represents the sum of the squares of the maximum sustained wind speed (knots) for every (sub)tropical storm's intensity of over 33 knots (38 mph; 61 km/h), divided by 10,000 while they are above that threshold; therefore, tropical depressions are not included.) Broadly speaking, ACE is a measure of the power of a tropical storm multiplied by the length of time it existed. Therefore, a stronger storm with a longer duration contributes more to the seasonal total than several short-lived, weaker storms combined.

Overall, 26 tropical depressions formed, with 23 reaching tropical storm intensity. Thirteen of the tropical storms became hurricanes, with 10 reaching major hurricane intensity. (Note: A major hurricane is one that ranks at Category 3 or higher on the Saffir–Simpson scale.) El Niño-like conditions prevailed across much of the basin, leading to elevated activity. Sea surface temperatures were above average for much of the season, stretching from the coast of North America to near the 150th meridian east. A subpolar gyre located in the Northern Atlantic increased atmospheric convection and reduced vertical wind shear across the Eastern Pacific. Wind shear near Hawaii's Big Island decreased even more after the subtropical jet pushed northward in September. Higher levels of humidity were present between 10°N–20°N at a height of 4,781–9,882 ft (1,457–3,012 m). Storms were also kept in more favorable environments by stronger easterlies as a result of an above-normal subtropical ridge.

The season started with the formation of Tropical Depression One-E on May 10, which was five days before the official start of hurricane season in the Eastern Pacific. There were five named storms in June, tied with 1985 for the most during the month. Aletta and Bud both intensified into Category 4 major hurricanes, marking the first time since 2010 that two occurred in June. After a below-normal July, August had above-normal activity. Hurricane Hector spent more days as a major hurricane than any other storm in the basin. In mid-August, Hurricane Lane became a Category 5 hurricane before it brought record rainfall to Hawaii's Big Island, becoming the wettest tropical cyclone for that state and the second wettest in the United States. September saw the formation of five tropical cyclones – Olivia, Paul, Nineteen-E, Rosa, and Sergio. Hurricane Olivia became the first tropical cyclone in recorded history to make landfall on the islands of Maui and Lanai on September 12. Tropical Depression Nineteen-E formed in the Gulf of California on September 19, the first such instance in recorded history. In October, both hurricanes Walaka and Willa became Category 5 hurricanes, the latter of which hit Sinaloa as a weakened hurricane. After Tropical Storm Xavier dissipated on November 6, the season ended on November 30.

== Systems ==
=== Tropical Depression One-E ===
- Tropical depression (SSHWS)
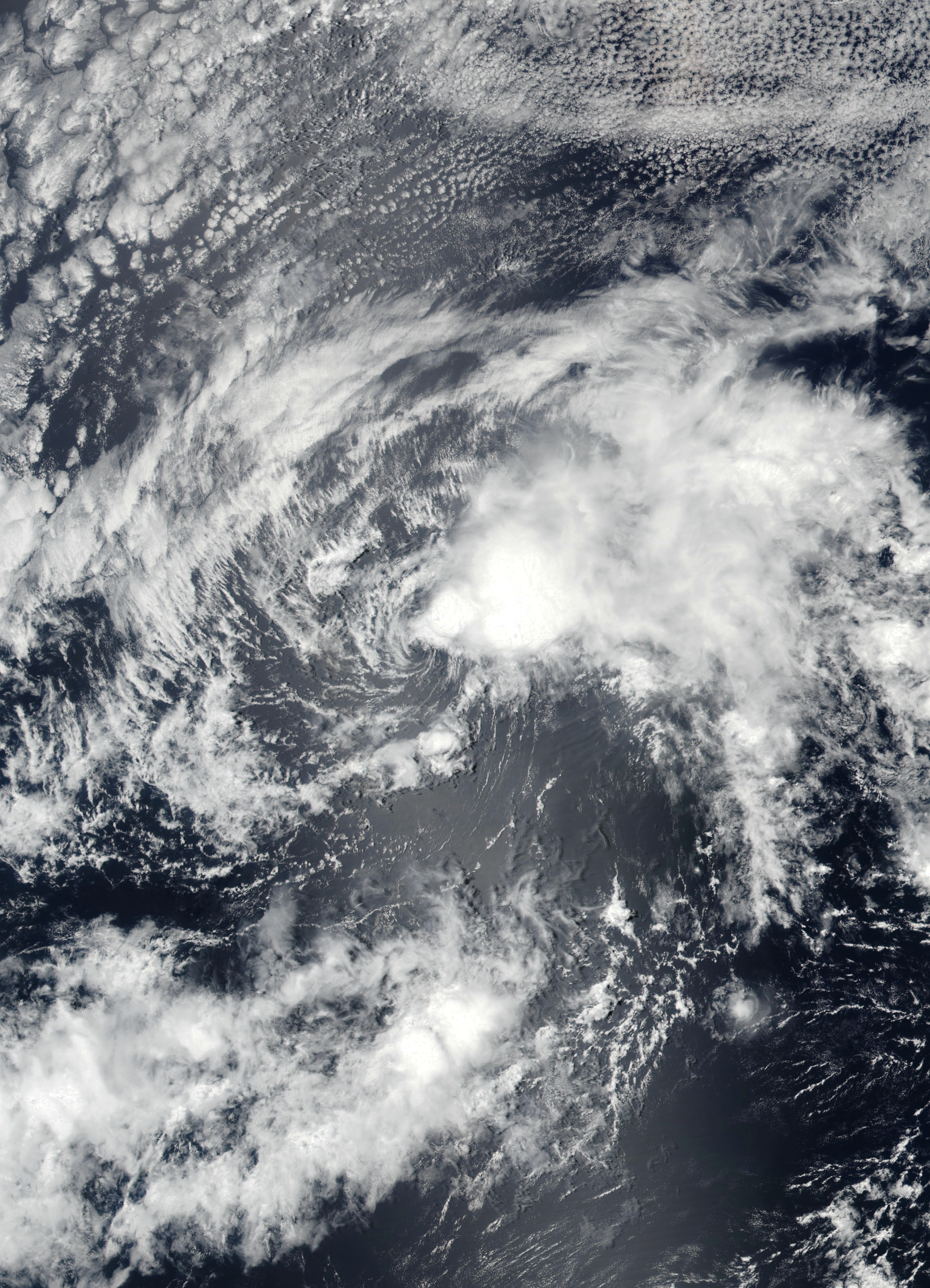
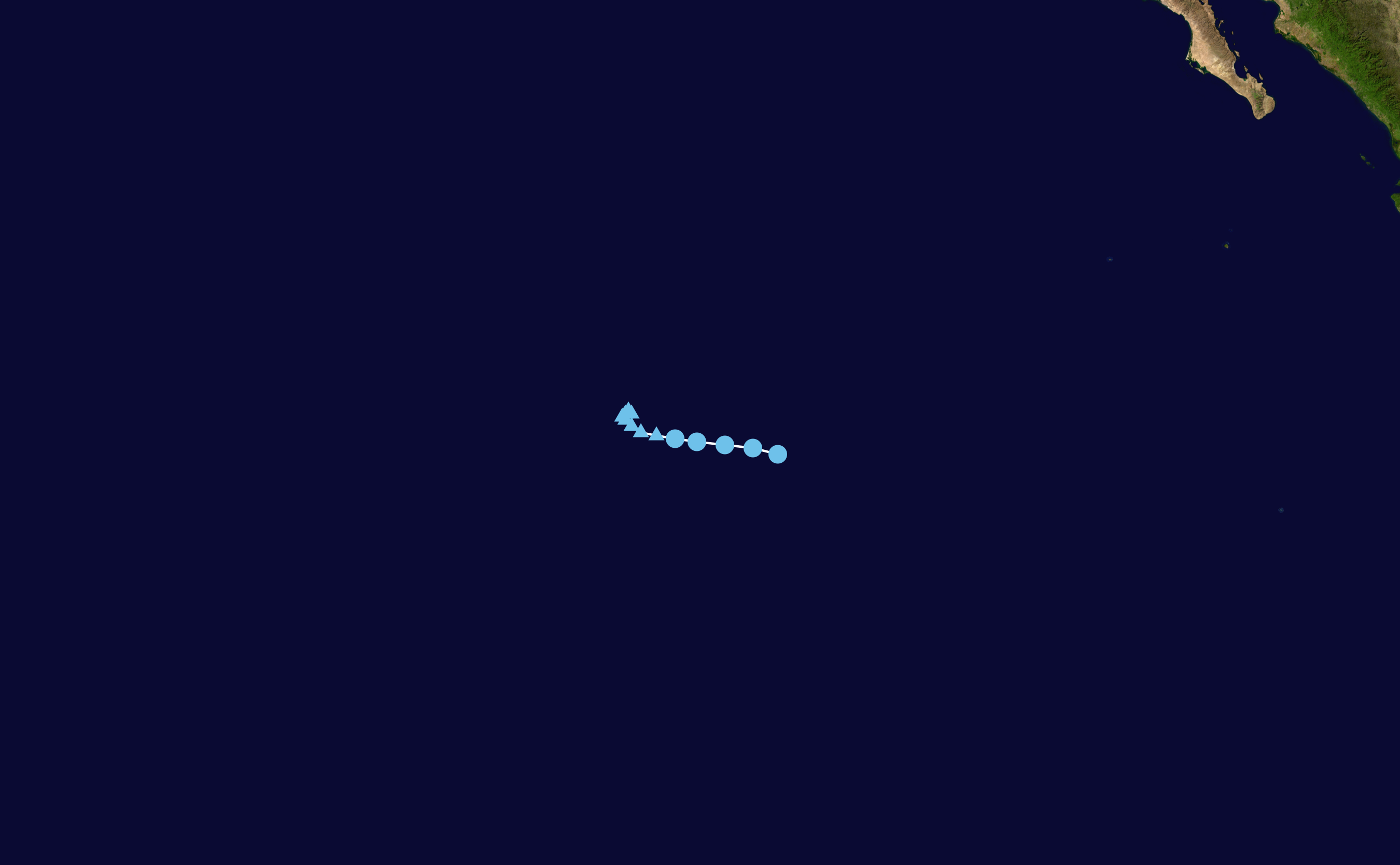
- Duration: May 10 – May 11
- Peak intensity: 35 mph (55 km/h) (1-min); 1007 mbar (hPa)

In early May, a disturbance formed within the Intertropical Convergence Zone (ITCZ), south of the Gulf of Tehuantepec. The system propagated westward over the next several days, spawning an area of low pressure on May 8. Convection or thunderstorm activity initially decreased, before steadily increasing and organizing around the system's center on May 10. A tropical depression formed at 12:00 UTC on the same day, while located approximately 1,265 mi (2,036 km) west-southwest of the southern tip of the Baja California Peninsula. Moderate-to-high wind shear produced by an upper-level trough located to the west prevented the depression from strengthening any further as it continued westward. By 18:00 UTC on May 11, the depression had weakened into a remnant low after losing all of its convection as a result of the increasing shear. The depression's remnants dissipated one day later while about 1,495 mi (2,406 km) west-southwest of the southern tip of Baja California.

=== Hurricane Aletta ===
- Category 4 hurricane (SSHWS)
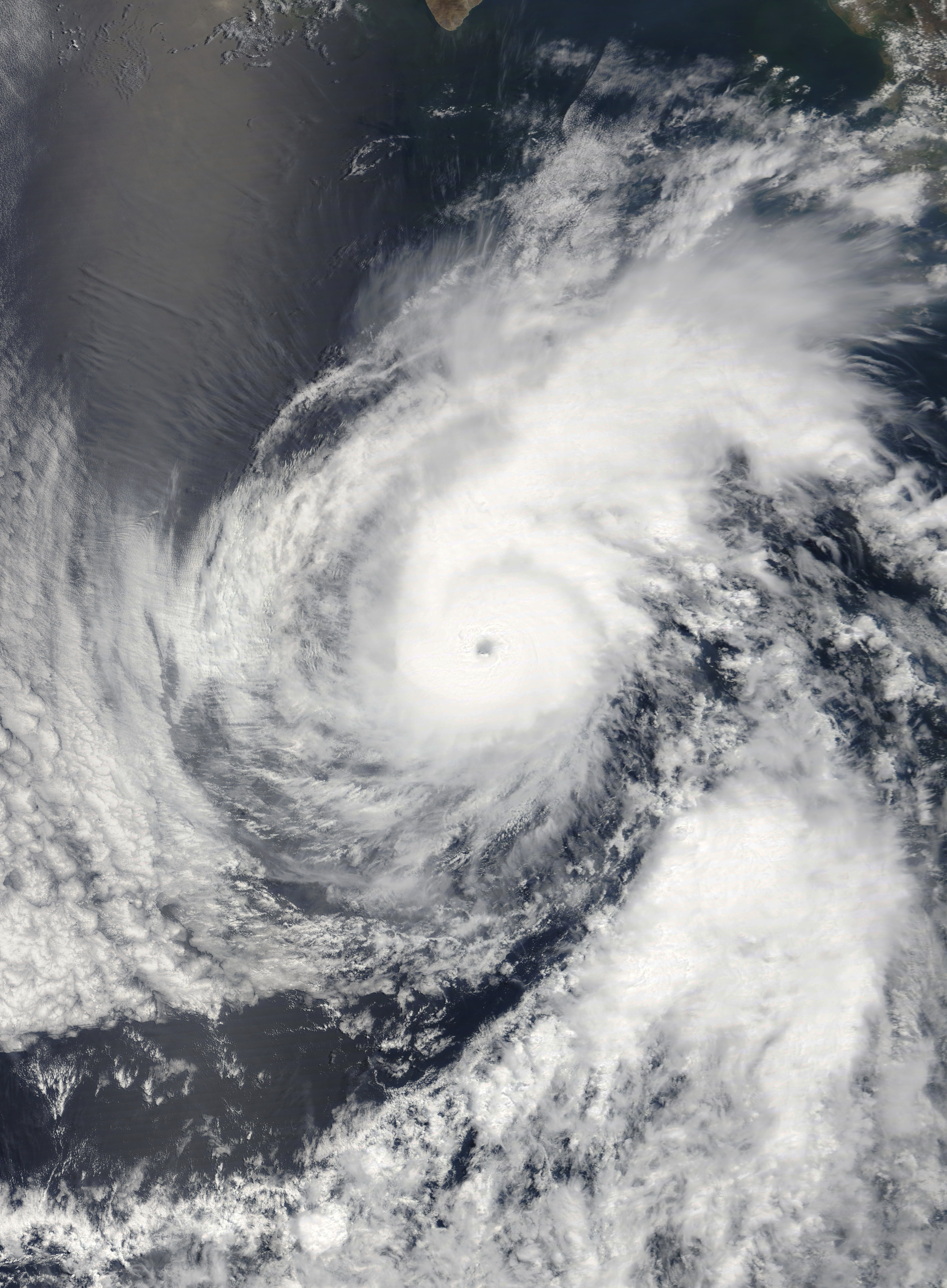
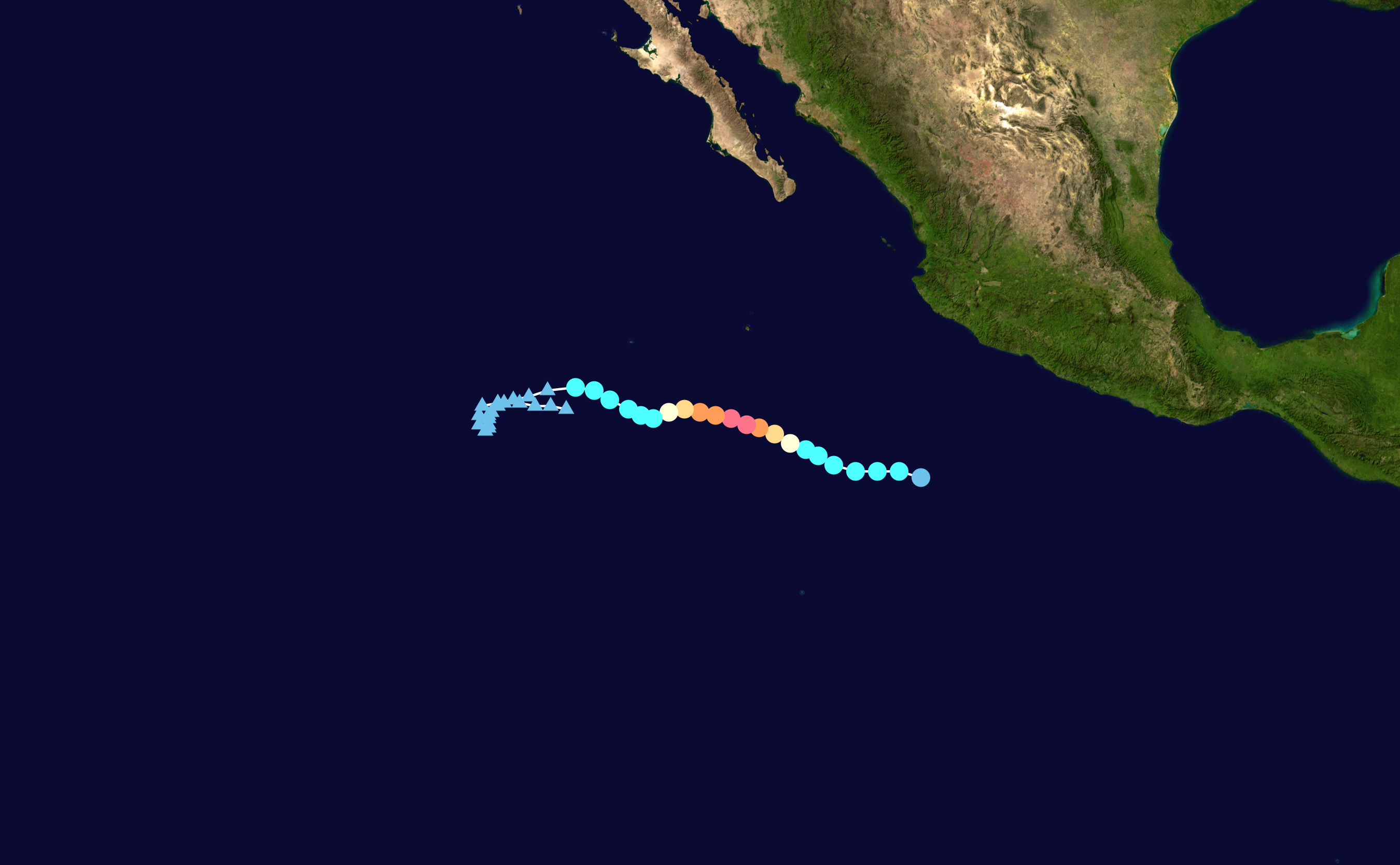
- Duration: June 6 – June 11
- Peak intensity: 140 mph (220 km/h) (1-min); 943 mbar (hPa)

A tropical wave departed from the western coast of Africa on May 22. The wave traversed the Atlantic Ocean and Caribbean, before later crossing over Central America and entering the Pacific Ocean. Convection associated with the system increased on June 3 while it was located south of the Gulf of Tehuantepec. Over the next couple of days, the system continued to organize, with banding features becoming established. After the storm's center became demarcated, a tropical depression formed at 00:00 UTC on June 6, while located approximately 345 mi (555 km) south-southwest of Manzanillo, Mexico. At that time, the system was located within favorable environmental conditions of near 86 °F (30 °C) sea surface temperatures and very low wind shear.

The depression intensified into Tropical Storm Aletta at 06:00 on June 6, and gradually strengthened over the next day before rapid intensification ensued. Aletta peaked as a Category 4 hurricane with maximum sustained winds of 140 mph (220 km/h) and a minimum central pressure of 943 mbar (27.85 inHg) at 12:00 UTC on June 8, while located about 575 mi (925 km) south-southwest of Manzanillo. Meanwhile, the hurricane was traveling north of west by the flow of a subtropical ridge, which was located over the southwestern United States. Aletta began to rapidly weaken on June 9 after it moved into a region of cooler sea surface temperatures and stable air. The system was downgraded to a remnant low at 12:00 UTC on June 11 after it lost all of its convection. Aletta's remnants were influenced by a surface flow for several days before they dissipated.

=== Hurricane Bud ===
- Category 4 hurricane (SSHWS)
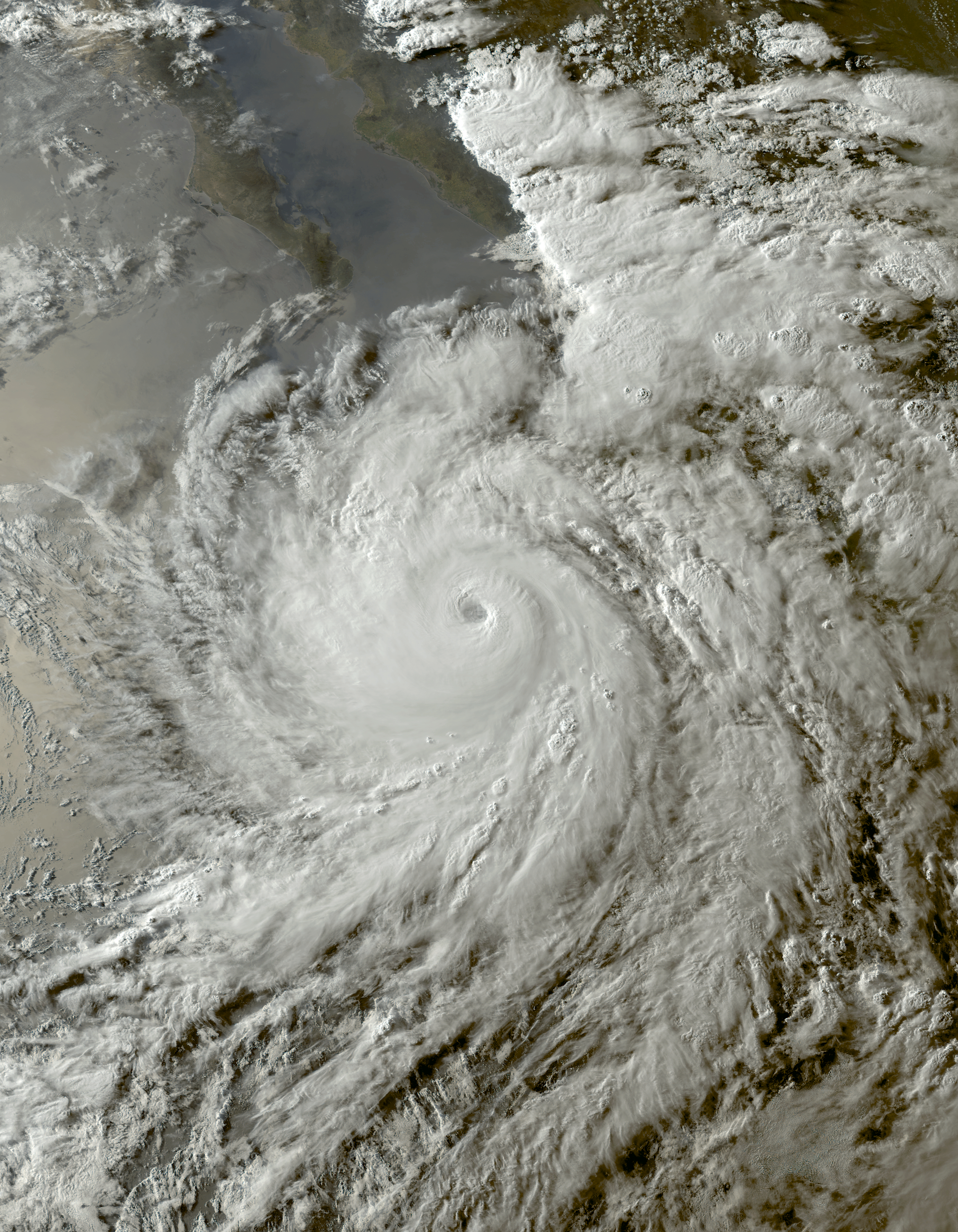
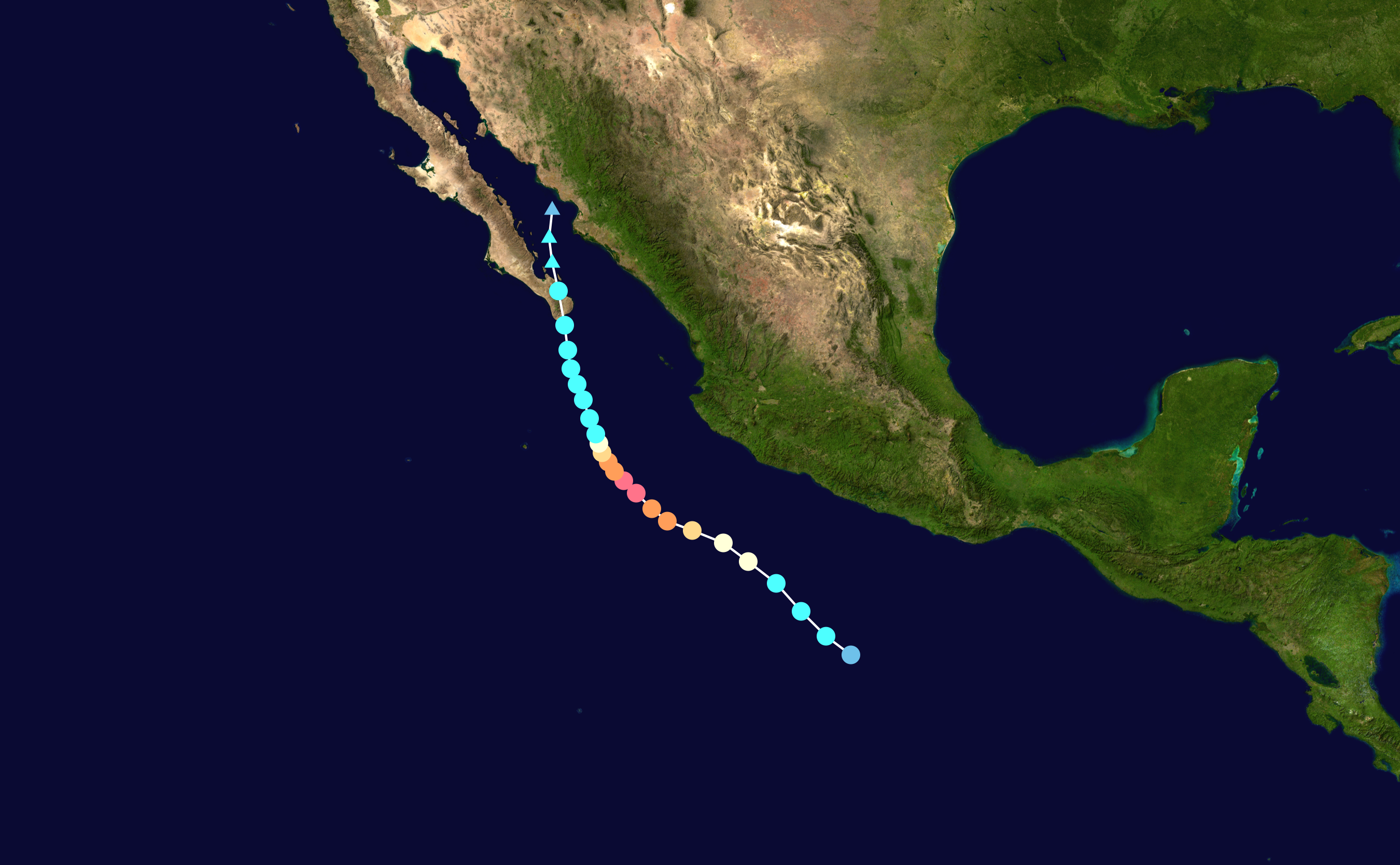
- Duration: June 9 – June 15
- Peak intensity: 140 mph (220 km/h) (1-min); 943 mbar (hPa)

A tropical wave departed from the western coast of Africa on May 29 and propagated westward across the Atlantic Ocean, eventually entering the Eastern Pacific on June 6. Associated convective activity increased considerably on June 8 as the result of a nearby Kelvin wave. A low-pressure area formed the next day and continued to increase in organization, spawning a tropical depression at 18:00 UTC on June 9, about 330 mi (530 km) south of Acapulco, Mexico. At that time, the storm was moving in a west-northwest to northwest direction around a mid-level ridge that was located over Mexico. The depression quickly strengthened into Tropical Storm Bud and rapidly intensified thereafter due to warm sea surface temperatures and abundant mid-level moisture. Bud became a hurricane at 18:00 UTC on June 10 and a Category 3 major hurricane by 12:00 UTC on June 11. The cyclone ultimately peaked as a Category 4 hurricane with winds of 140 mph (220 km/h) and a pressure of 943 mbar (27.85 inHg) around 00:00 UTC on June 12, while located approximately 200 mi (320 km) southwest of Manzanillo, Mexico. After Bud's peak intensity, the hurricane rapidly weakened back to a tropical storm. Moderately warm sea surface temperatures allowed Bud to maintain some of its strength, although its structure degraded as it approached Baja California Sur. Bud made landfall near San José del Cabo around 02:00 UTC on June 15, with winds of 45 miles per hour (75 km/h). Increasing wind shear and the mountainous terrain of Baja California Sur caused Bud to weaken into a post-tropical cyclone by 12:00 UTC. The circulation opened up into a trough about 12 hours later, located around 35 mi (55 km) southwest of Huatabampito, Mexico.

Hurricane Bud prompted the issuance of tropical cyclone watches and warnings along Baja California Sur and the northwestern coast of Mexico. Strong wind gusts were recorded in Baja California, causing minimal damage. Despite remaining offshore for most of its track, the hurricane caused torrential rainfall and severe flooding in several regions. A peak rainfall total of 6.50 in (165 mm) was recorded in San Lorenzo, Sinaloa. In Guadalajara, Jalisco, hundreds of vehicles were inundated and swept away. A canal overflowed in Guadalajara, causing damage to multiple stores in a mall. At least 100 additional structures were damaged in the city. In Guerrero, hundreds of businesses and homes were flooded. Over 100 businesses in Pie de la Cuesta were damaged by strong waves. More than 60 homes in Maruata, Michoacán, experienced flood or wind damage. Heavy rainfall from Bud generated currents that swept away a child who was crossing a road in Mexico City. The remnants of Bud brought moisture to drought-stricken regions of the Southwestern United States, and slowed the advance of wildfires in Colorado and Wyoming.

=== Tropical Storm Carlotta ===
- Tropical storm (SSHWS)
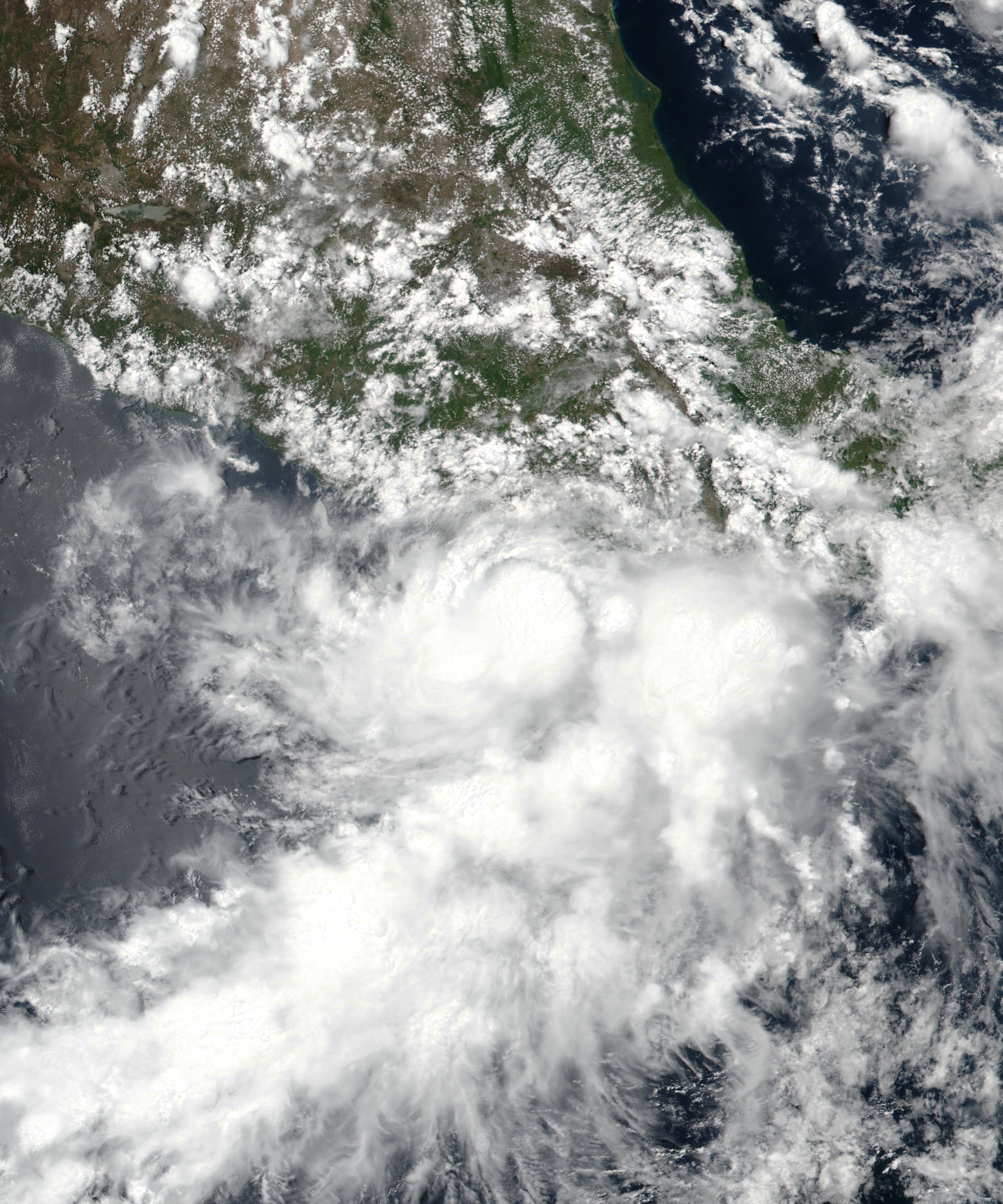
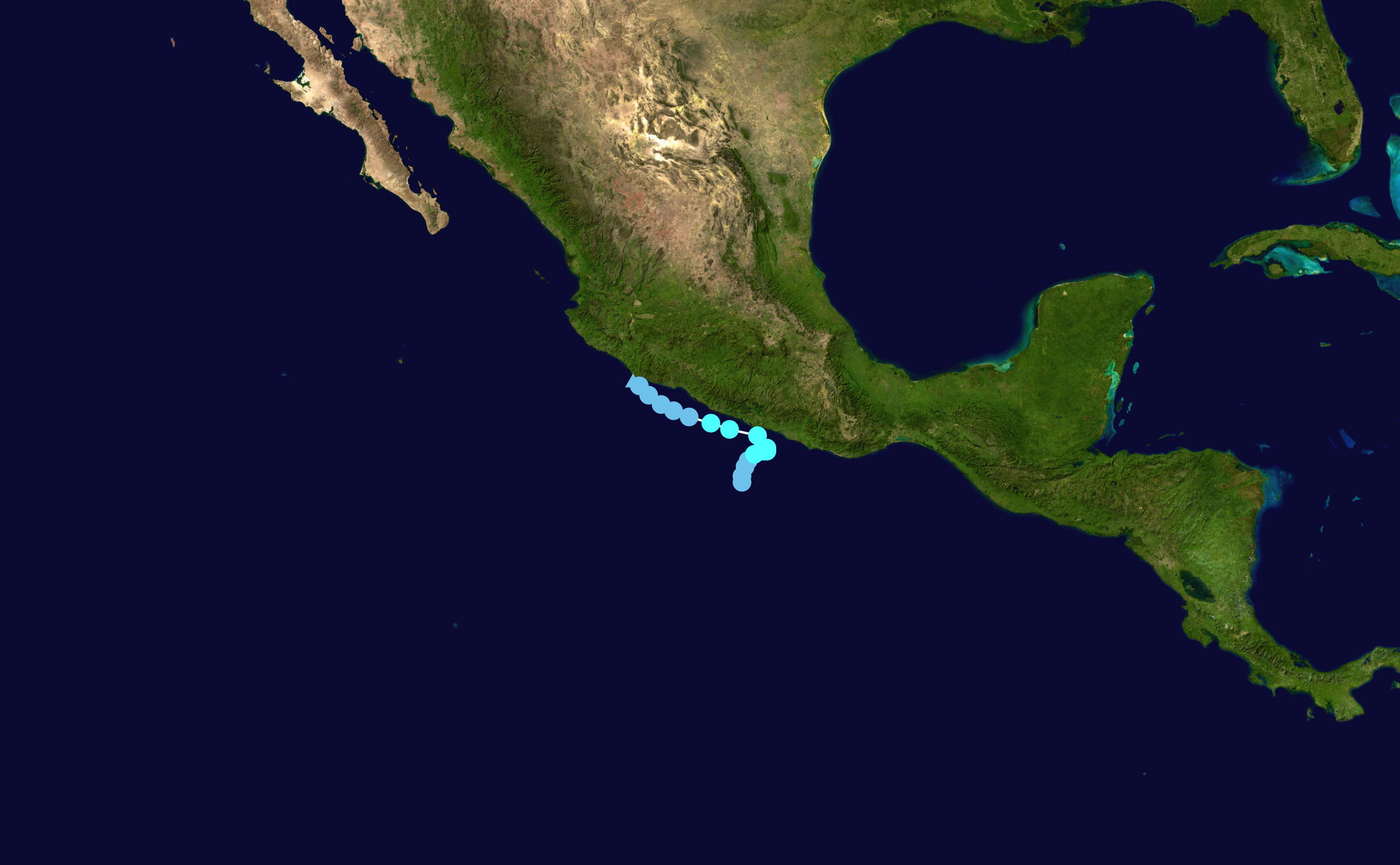
- Duration: June 14 – June 18
- Peak intensity: 65 mph (100 km/h) (1-min); 997 mbar (hPa)

A low-pressure area developed on June 12 south of the Gulf of Tehuantepec. Two days later, the system's convection organized enough for the low to be classified as a tropical depression approximately 140 mi (225 km) south of Acapulco, Mexico. The nascent depression tracked north-northeastward toward the Mexican coast. Wind shear prevented strengthening initially, but the depression became Tropical Storm Carlotta around 18:00 UTC on June 15. The storm temporarily stalled on June 16 just off the coast of Acapulco. At 00:00 UTC on June 17, Carlotta reached its peak intensity with winds of 65 mph (100 km/h) and a pressure of 997 mbar (29.44 inHg). Land interaction, dry air, and increasing wind shear caused the storm to weaken as it progressed to the west-northwest. Carlotta weakened to a tropical depression late on June 17, and deteriorated into a remnant low by early on June 19. The system dissipated offshore between Manzanillo and Zihuatanejo, Mexico shortly after.

Tropical Storm Carlotta warranted the issuance of tropical storm watches and warnings along the southern coast of Mexico. Carlotta caused severe flooding in the states of Aguascalientes, Guerrero, Michoacán, Oaxaca, and Puebla, as well as the Yucatán Peninsula; the storm also killed a total of three people. A peak rainfall total of 11.2 in (285 mm) was recorded in Melchor Ocampo, Michoacán. Carlotta and two other systems dropped 3–20 in (70–400 mm) of rain across the Yucatán Peninsula, resulting in severe flooding. In Oaxaca, dwellings, a hospital, utilities, and roads and bridges sustained wind and flood damage. Multiple rivers overflowed their banks in Michoacán, flooding several homes and damaging water pumps. Carlotta also caused several landslides throughout the state. Insurance claims related to the storm reached US$7.6 million (MX$156 million) statewide. Another 12 houses were flooded in Aguascalientes.

=== Tropical Storm Daniel ===
- Tropical storm (SSHWS)
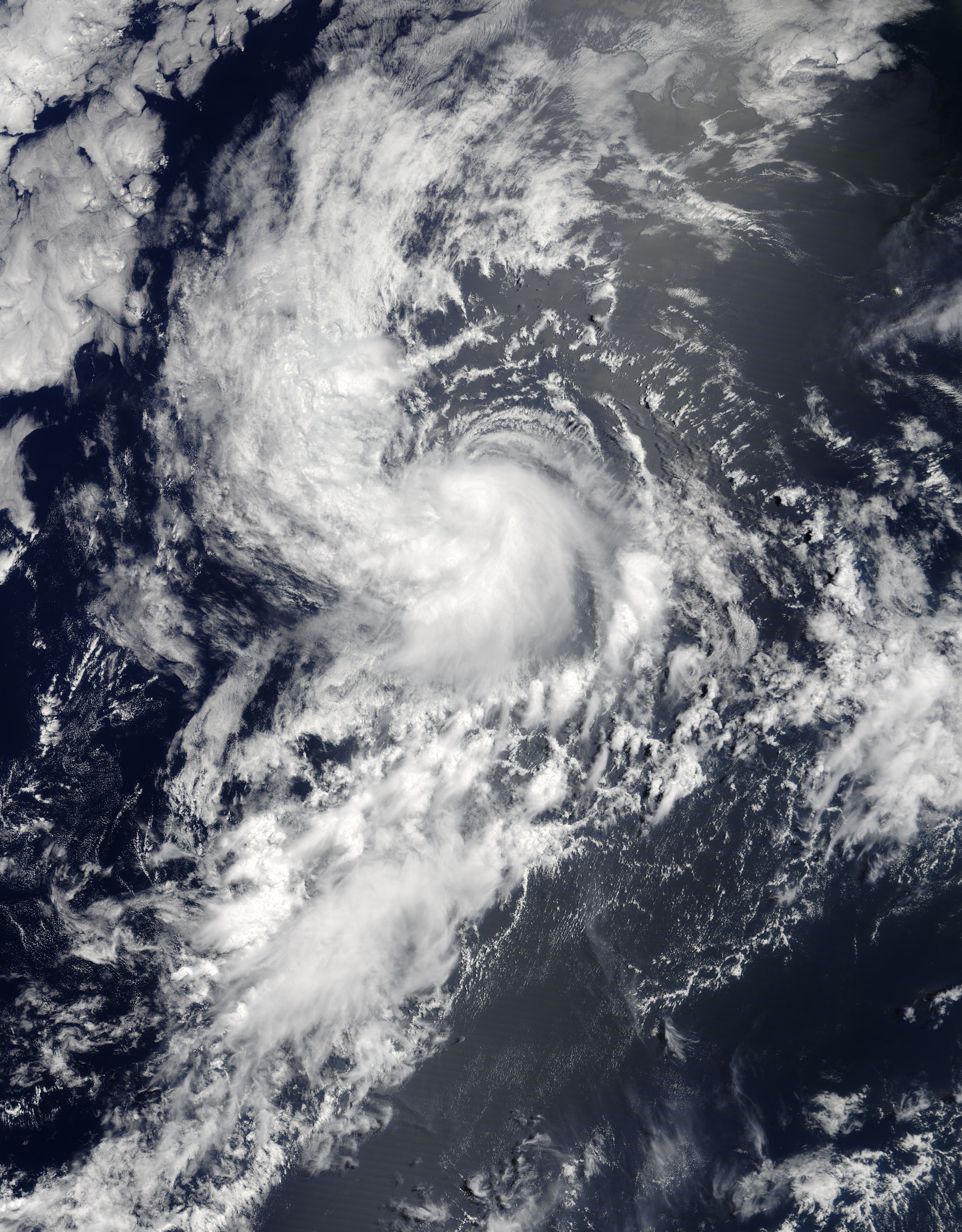
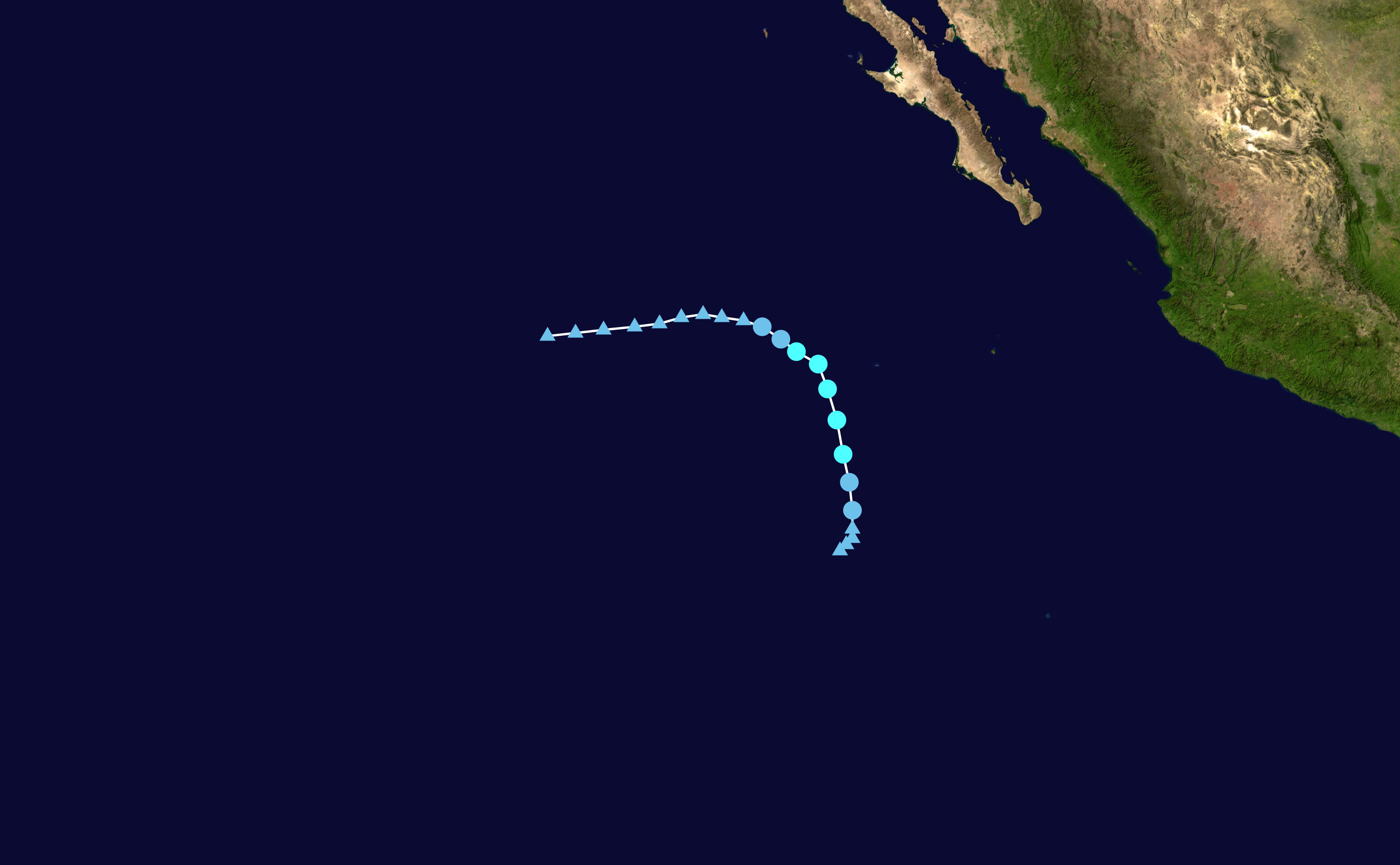
- Duration: June 24 – June 26
- Peak intensity: 45 mph (75 km/h) (1-min); 1004 mbar (hPa)

The dissipating Tropical Storm Carlotta dragged a part of the ITCZ northward. This resulted in the formation of an area of thunderstorms on June 18, and after a tropical wave entered the region, a weak low-pressure area developed on June 21. The disturbance improved in organization over the next couple of days, forming a tropical depression on June 24 at 00:00 UTC, approximately 725 mi (1,167 km) south-southwest of the southern tip of the Baja California peninsula. Throughout the day, the storm was propelled northward by a mid- to upper-level low that was located to the west. Around 12:00 UTC, the depression strengthened into Tropical Storm Daniel as a result of warm sea surface temperatures and low wind shear. The cyclone peaked six hours later with 45 mph (75 km/h) winds and a pressure of 1,004 mbar (29.65 inHg). It maintained this intensity for twelve hours before succumbing to decreasing sea temperatures as it traveled northwestward. The convection of the storm completely dissipated, resulting in it becoming a remnant low around 06:00 UTC on June 26, while about 615 mi (990 km) west-southwest of the southern tip of the Baja California peninsula. The remnants of the storm journeyed south of west under the influence of the low-level trade winds, before later opening up into a trough on June 28.

=== Tropical Storm Emilia ===
- Tropical storm (SSHWS)
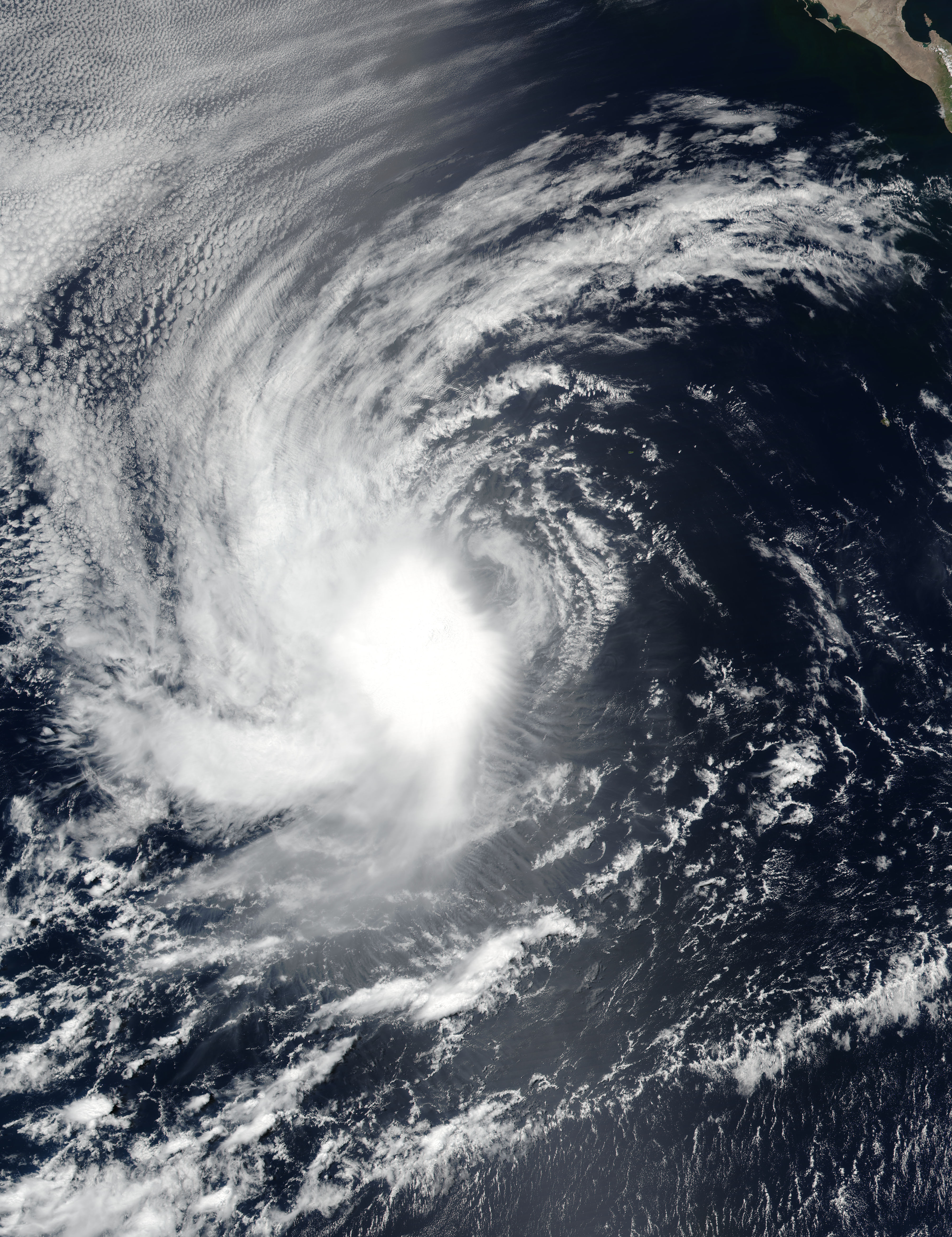
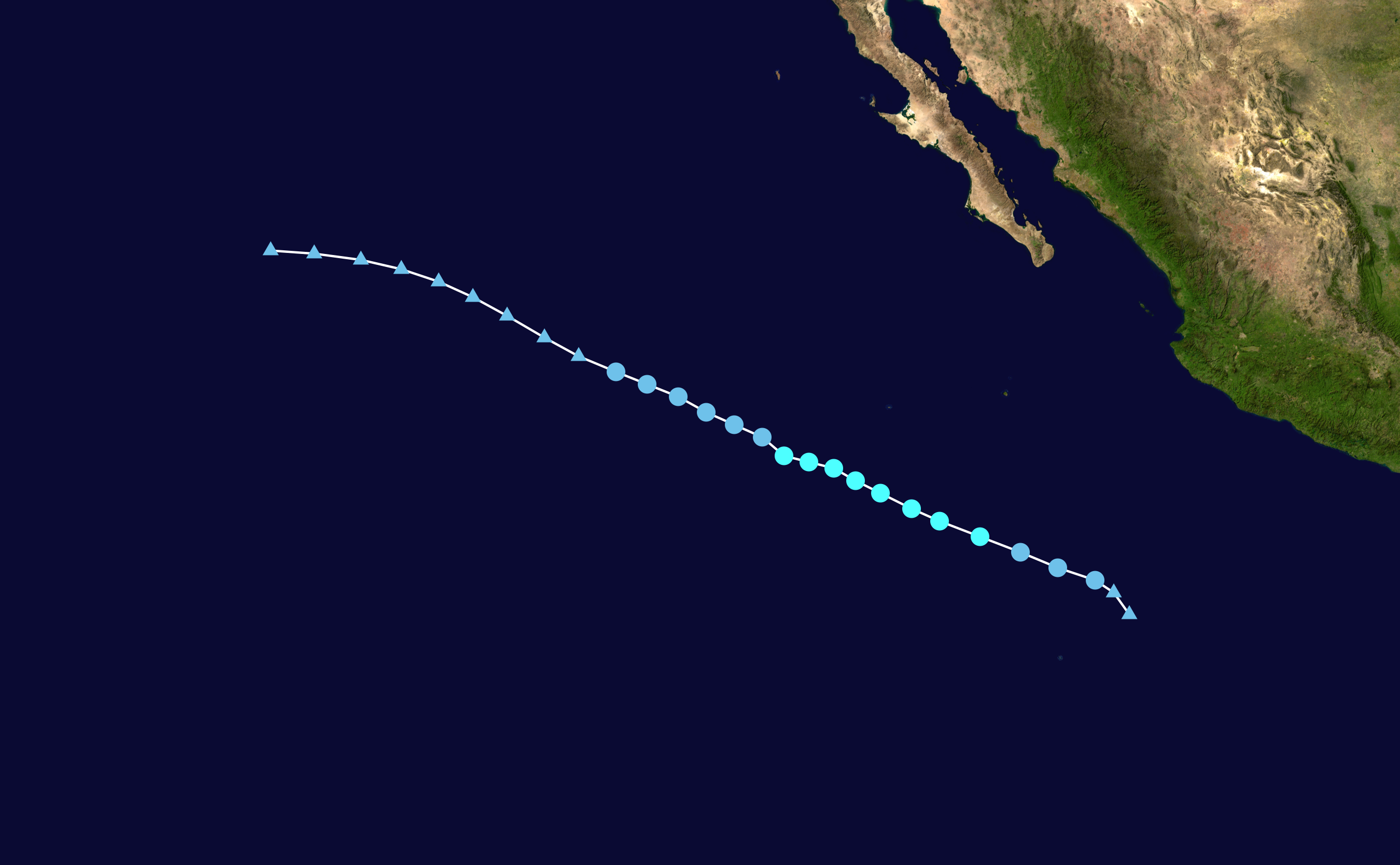
- Duration: June 27 – July 1
- Peak intensity: 60 mph (95 km/h) (1-min); 997 mbar (hPa)

A well-defined tropical wave departed from the western coast of Africa during the middle of June 14. It moved across the Atlantic Ocean without development, and the wave entered the Pacific Ocean on June 24. There, its convection increased as it interacted with the Pacific monsoon trough. The system continued to organize over the next couple of days as it moved north of west, developing into a tropical depression on June 27 at 18:00 UTC, while about 470 mi (755 km) southwest of Manzanillo, Mexico. The depression slowly intensified, becoming Tropical Storm Emilia around 12:00 UTC on June 28. Despite moderate wind shear, Emilia attained peak winds of 60 mph (95 km/h) on June 29 about 600 mi (965 km) southwest of the southern tip of the Baja California peninsula. The storm briefly maintained this intensity before a combination of shear, mid-level dry air, and cooling sea surface temperatures caused it to weaken. By 12:00 UTC on June 30, Emila had weakened into a tropical depression. The system decayed into a remnant low by 00:00 UTC on July 2 as it continued west-northwest. The remnants of Emilia dissipated around 54 hours later while over 1,495 mi (2,406 km) west of Baja California.

=== Hurricane Fabio ===
- Category 2 hurricane (SSHWS)
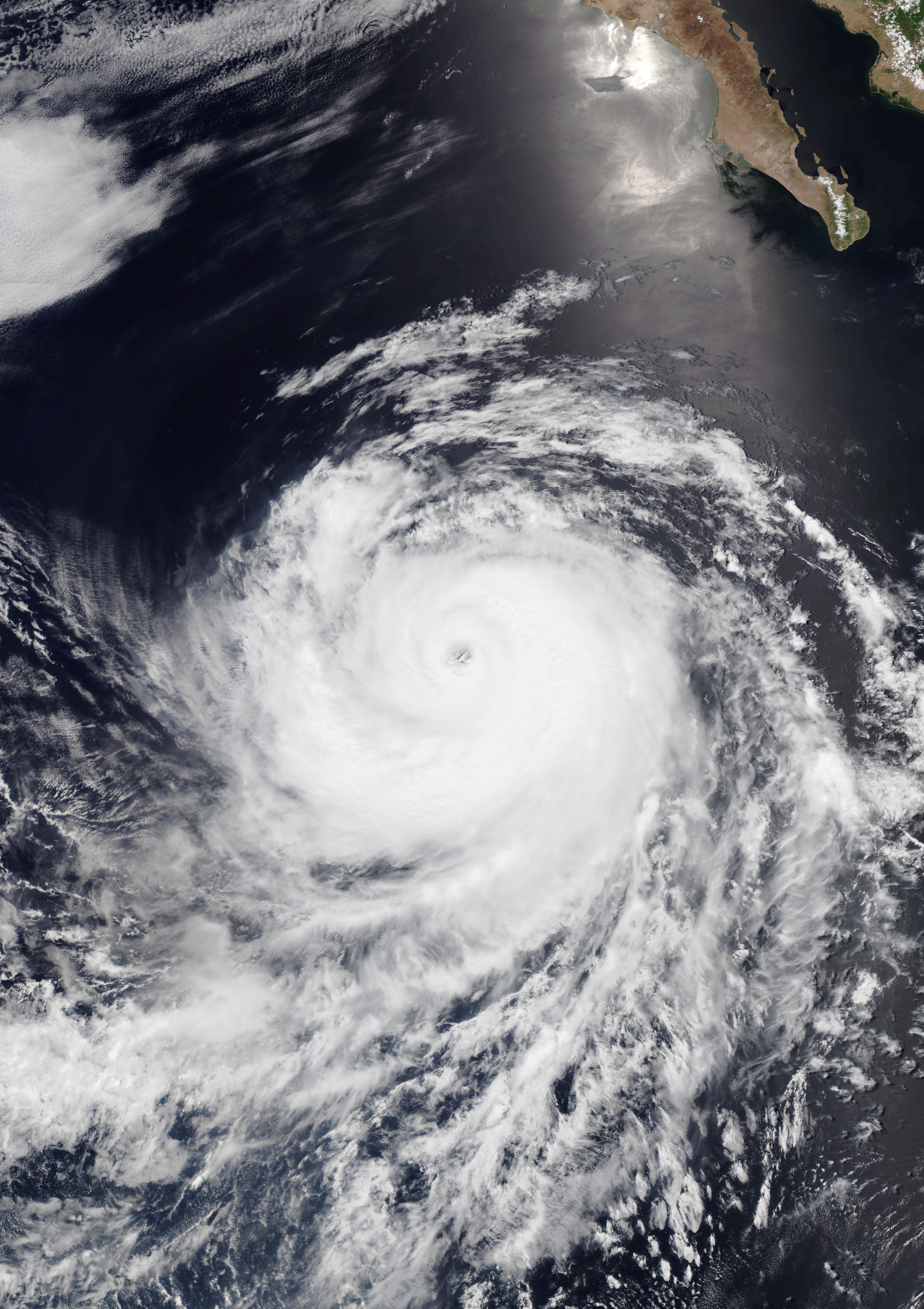
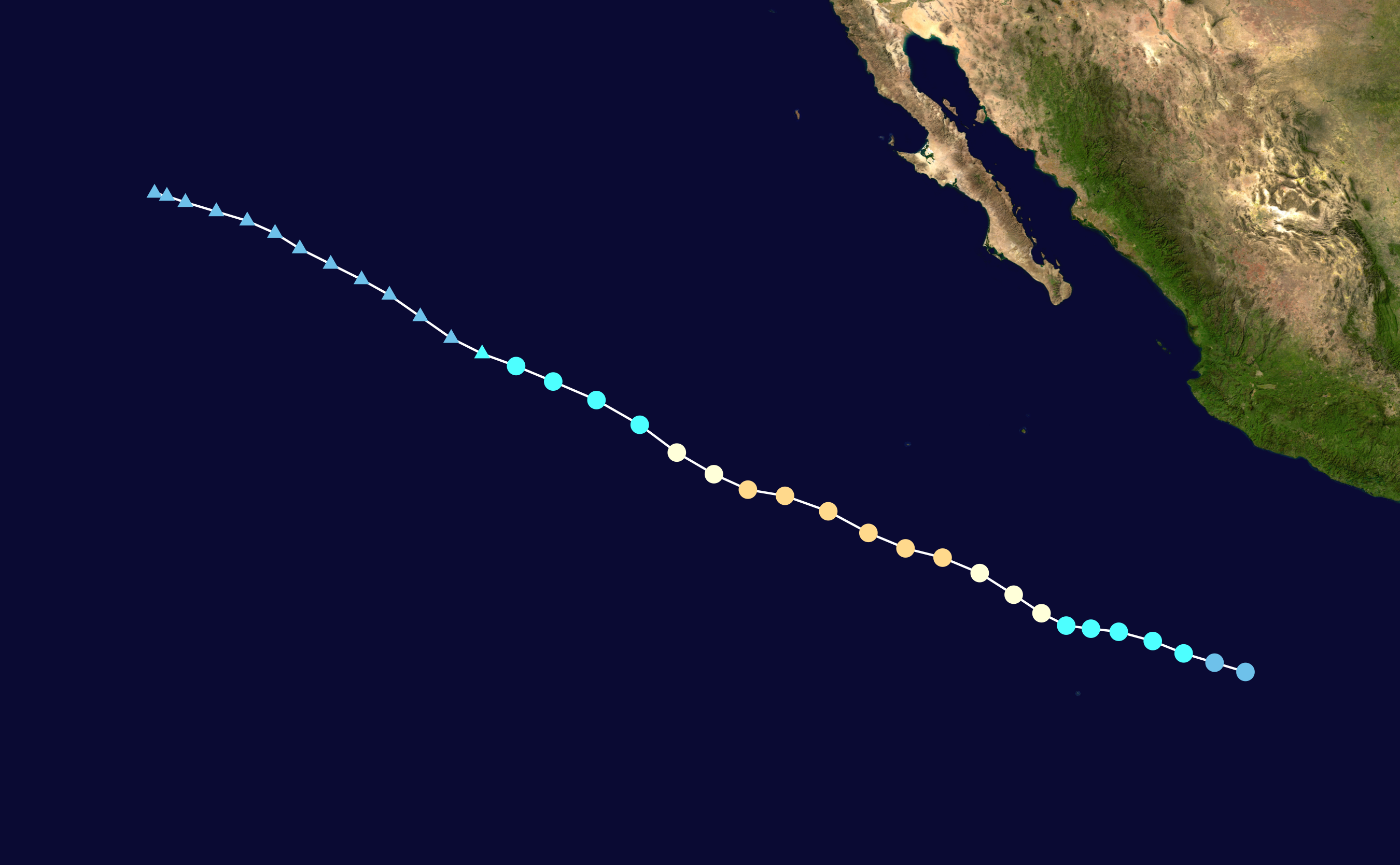
- Duration: June 30 – July 6
- Peak intensity: 110 mph (175 km/h) (1-min); 964 mbar (hPa)

A tropical wave emerged from the western coast of Africa on June 16, and ten days later it crossed Central America into the Eastern Pacific Ocean. Convection increased markedly thereafter as the wave continued westward for the next couple of days, developing a low-pressure area on June 28. A tropical depression developed at 18:00 UTC on June 30, while approximately 575 mi (925 km) south of Manzanillo, Mexico. A mid-level ridge located over central Mexico steered the nascent depression towards the west-northwest as the storm continued to intensify. The depression strengthened into Tropical Storm Fabio around 06:00 UTC on July 1. Located within a favorable environment of warm sea surface temperatures, moist air, and low wind shear, Fabio continued to consolidate over the next couple of days. Fabio became a Category 1 hurricane around 12:00 UTC on July 2. The storm peaked at 18:00 UTC on the next day as a high-end Category 2 hurricane with winds of 110 mph (175 km/h) and a pressure of 964 mbar (28.47 inHg), while located 645 mi (1,038 km) southwest of the southern tip of the Baja California peninsula.

Fabio remained at peak intensity for about 12 hours, before quickly weakening as it moved over progressively cooler waters of near or below 68 °F (20 °C). The hurricane weakened into a tropical storm around 06:00 UTC on July 4, while about 920 mi (1,480 km) west-southwest of the southern tip of the Baja California peninsula. Fabio's convection degraded significantly as it entered a more stable environment; it weakened into a post-tropical cyclone by 06:00 UTC on July 6. The remnants continued towards the west-northwest and dissipated by 12:00 UTC on July 9, located approximately 1,840 mi (2,960 km) west-northwest of the southern tip of the Baja California peninsula.

=== Tropical Storm Gilma ===
- Tropical storm (SSHWS)
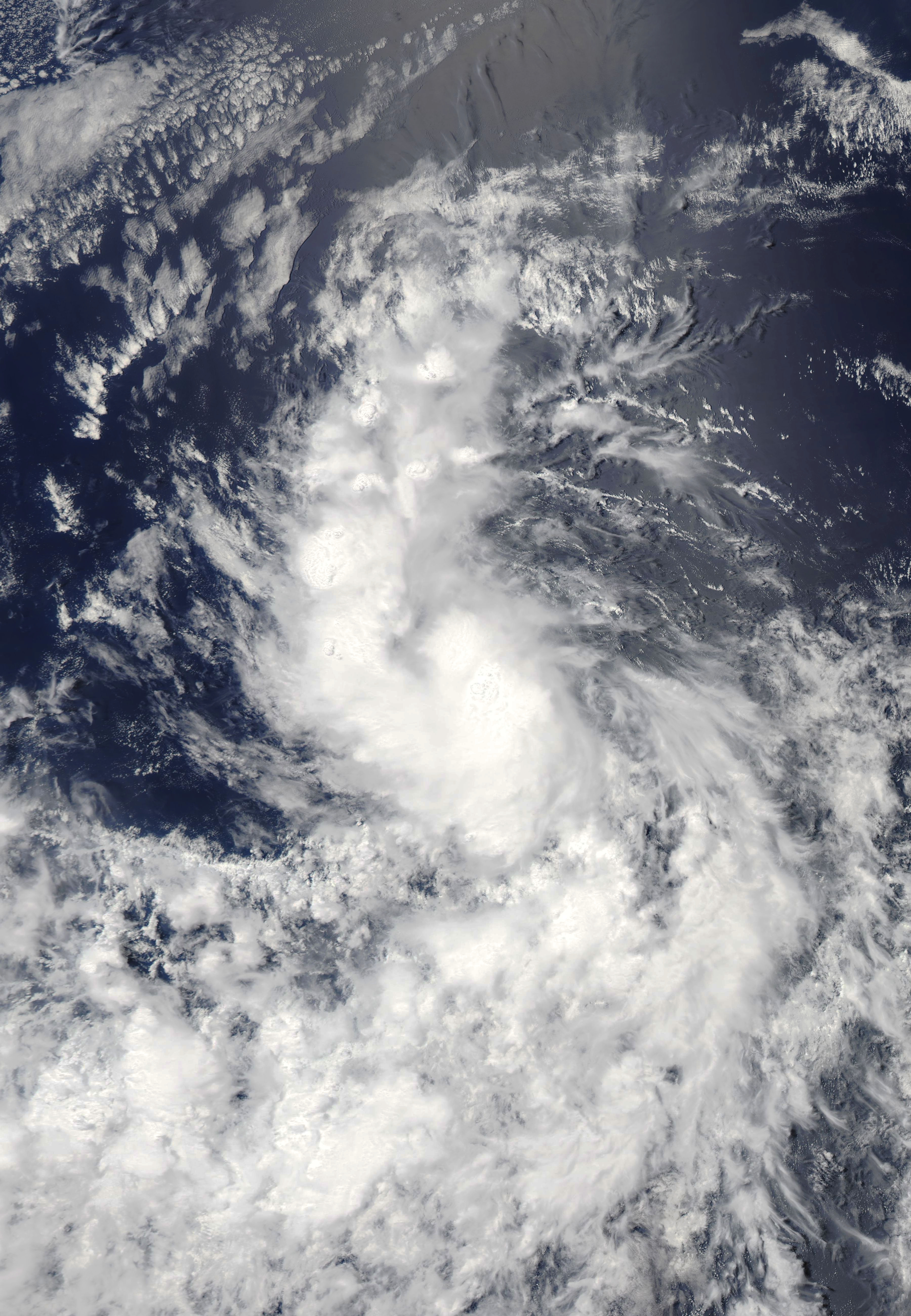
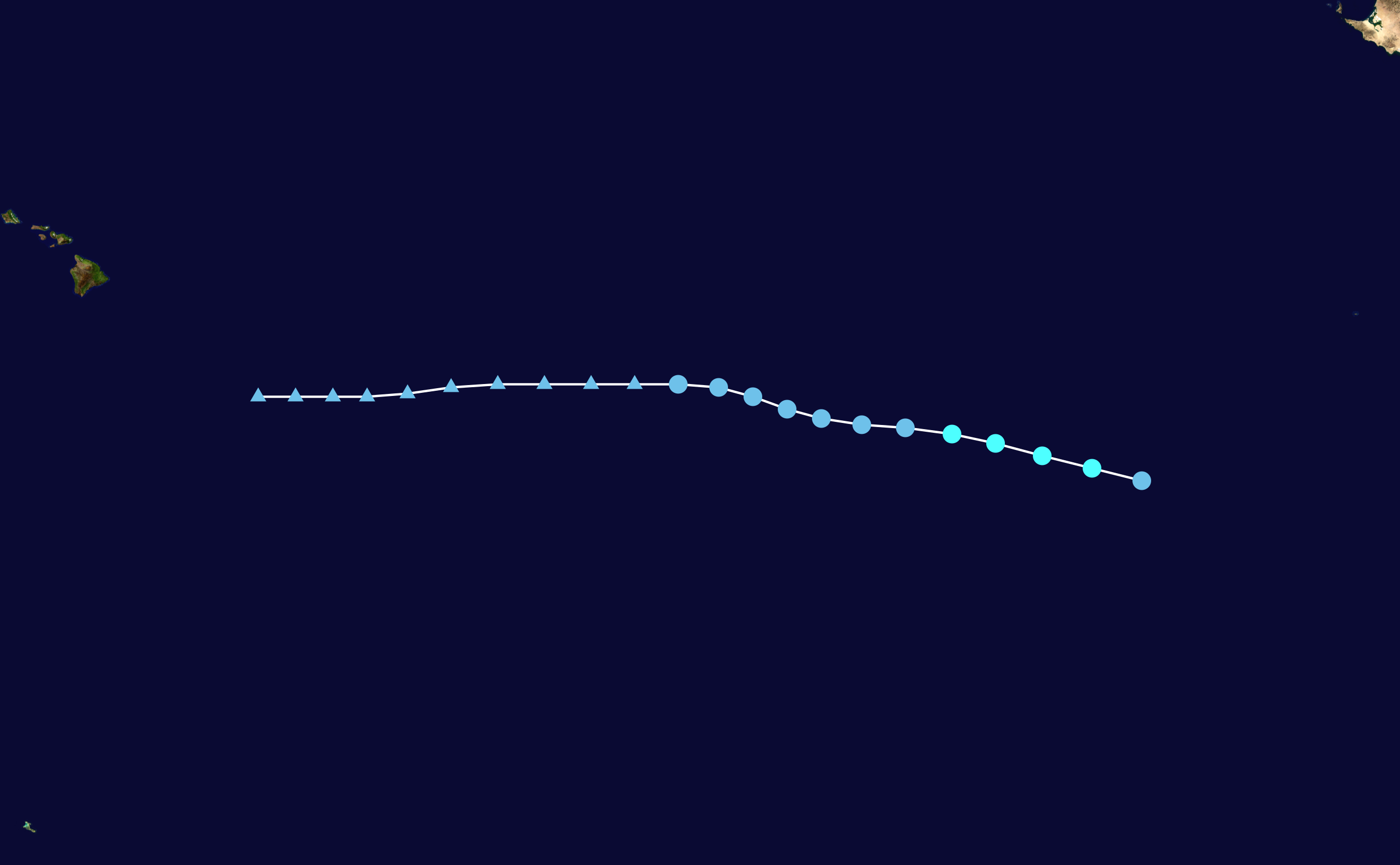
- Duration: July 26 – July 29
- Peak intensity: 45 mph (75 km/h) (1-min); 1005 mbar (hPa)

A tropical wave exited the western coast of Africa on July 13, and moved across the Atlantic, eventually entering the Pacific Ocean on July 22. Over the next couple of days, the wave continued westward with its convection pulsing intermittently. The low-level center and the convection organized into a tropical depression by 12:00 UTC on July 26, approximately 1,035 mi (1,666 km) southwest of the southern tip of the Baja California peninsula. Over the next 12 hours, the nascent depression traveled northwest along the south-southwestern edge of a mid-level ridge while intensifying; the system became Tropical Storm Gilma six hours after formation. Gilma reached its peak intensity of 45 mph (75 km/h) winds and a pressure of 1,005 mbar (29.68 inHg) at 06:00 UTC on July 27, while located 1,210 mi (1,950 km) west-southwest of the southern tip of the Baja California peninsula. The tropical storm began to succumb to increasing northwesterly wind shear soon after, resulting in the degradation of its convection; Gilma weakened into a tropical depression by 18:00 UTC on the same day. The depression had limited thunderstorm activity over the next couple of days before weakening into a remnant low around 12:00 UTC on July 29. The remnants crossed into the Central Pacific basin and dissipated two days later, around 405 mi (650 km) southeast of Hilo, Hawaii.

=== Tropical Depression Nine-E ===
- Tropical depression (SSHWS)
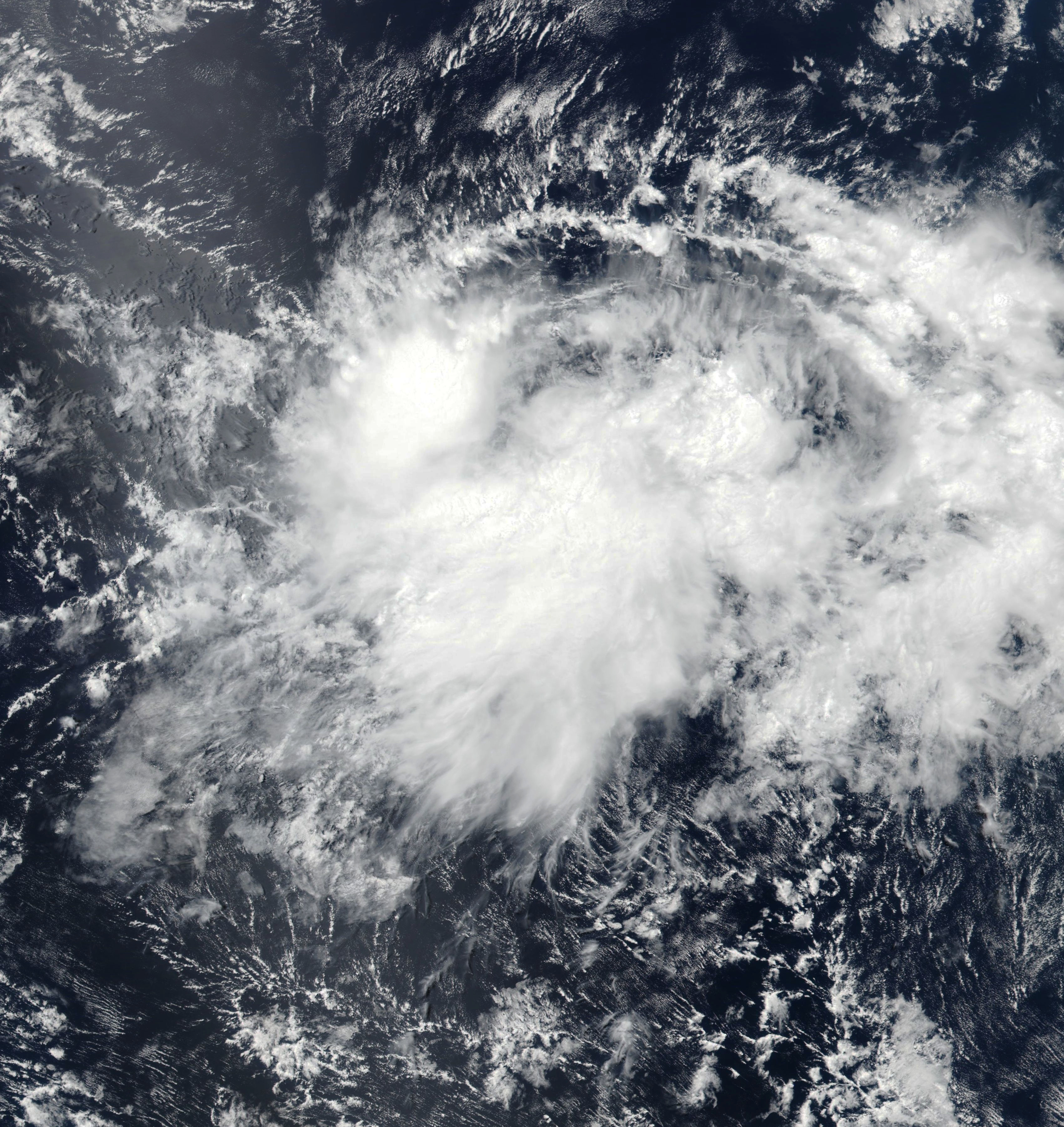
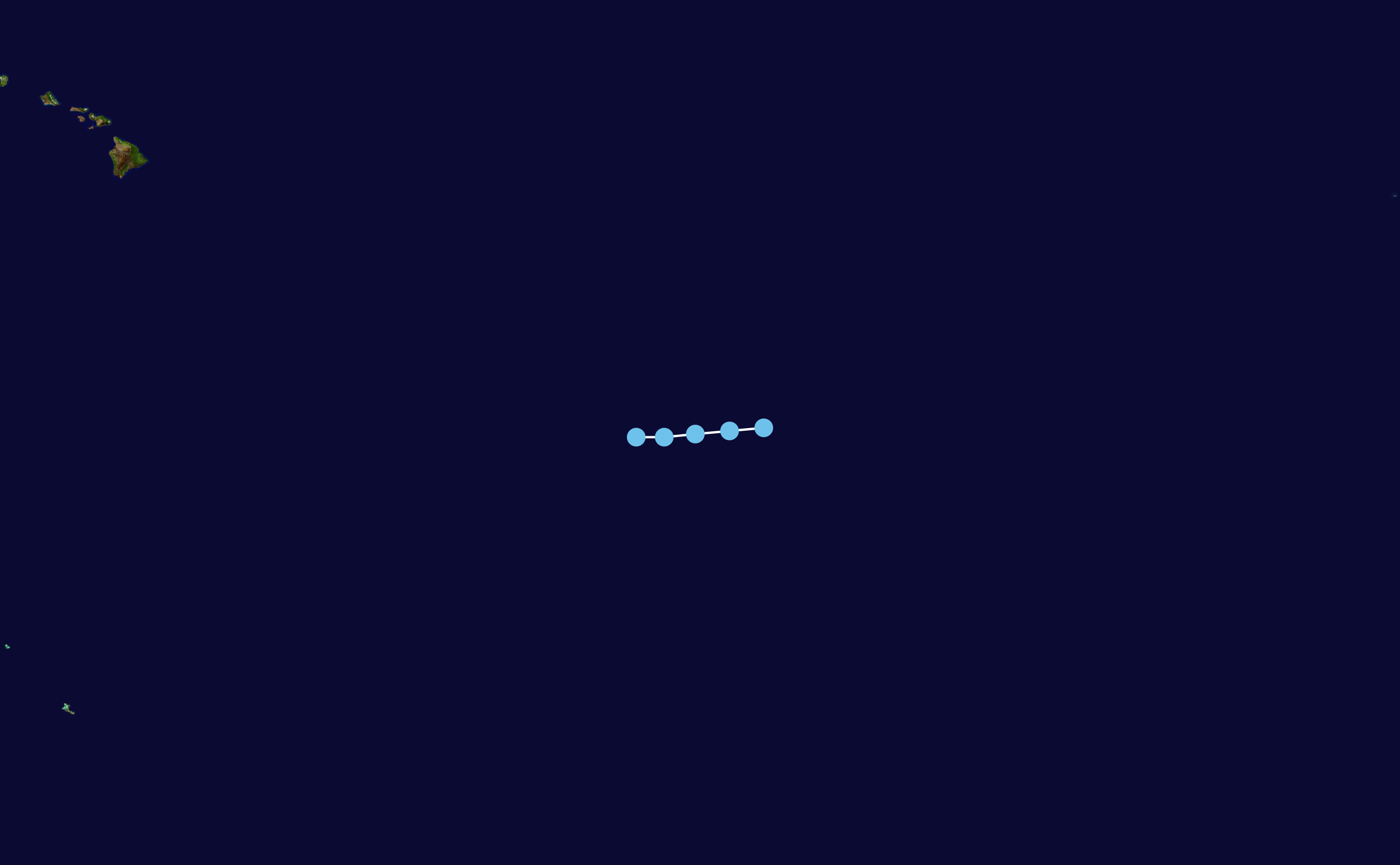
- Duration: July 26 – July 27
- Peak intensity: 35 mph (55 km/h) (1-min); 1007 mbar (hPa)

A passing Kelvin wave and a tropical wave increased convection within the ITCZ; after this increase, a low-pressure trough spawned within the monsoon trough on July 21, approximately 635 mi (1,022 km) south-southwest of Manzanillo, Mexico. Over the next several days, the system moved westward while experiencing northeasterly wind shear, which was imparted by an upper-level trough. The aforementioned combined with a moderately dry environment prevented the low-pressure trough from organizing further. The system generated some convection on July 23, but increasing wind shear prevented significant organization until July 26. The system reached a col or neutral point between the upper-level trough to the east and an upper-level ridge to the west. This allowed a tropical depression to form around 18:00 UTC on that day, approximately 1,440 mi (2,320 km) east-southeast of Hilo, Hawaii. The depression's convection was quickly removed to the south and west of its center as it entered a region of higher wind shear. This caused the depression to decay into a trough of low-pressure by 00:00 UTC on July 28, located about 1,210 mi (1,950 km) southeast of Hilo, Hawaii. The remnants produced sporadic convection as they continued westward over the Central Pacific during the next few days before dissipating.

=== Hurricane Hector ===
- Category 4 hurricane (SSHWS)
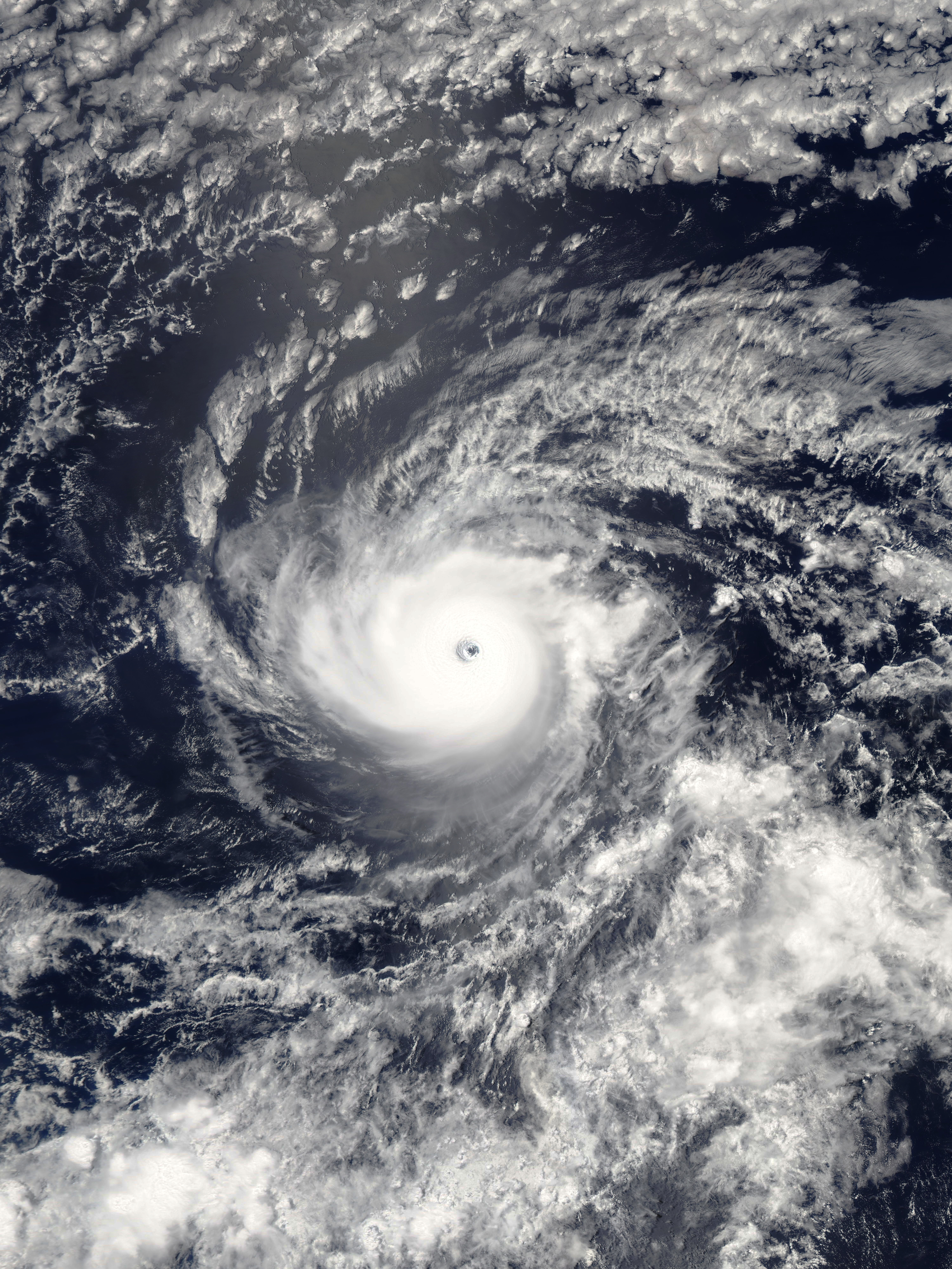
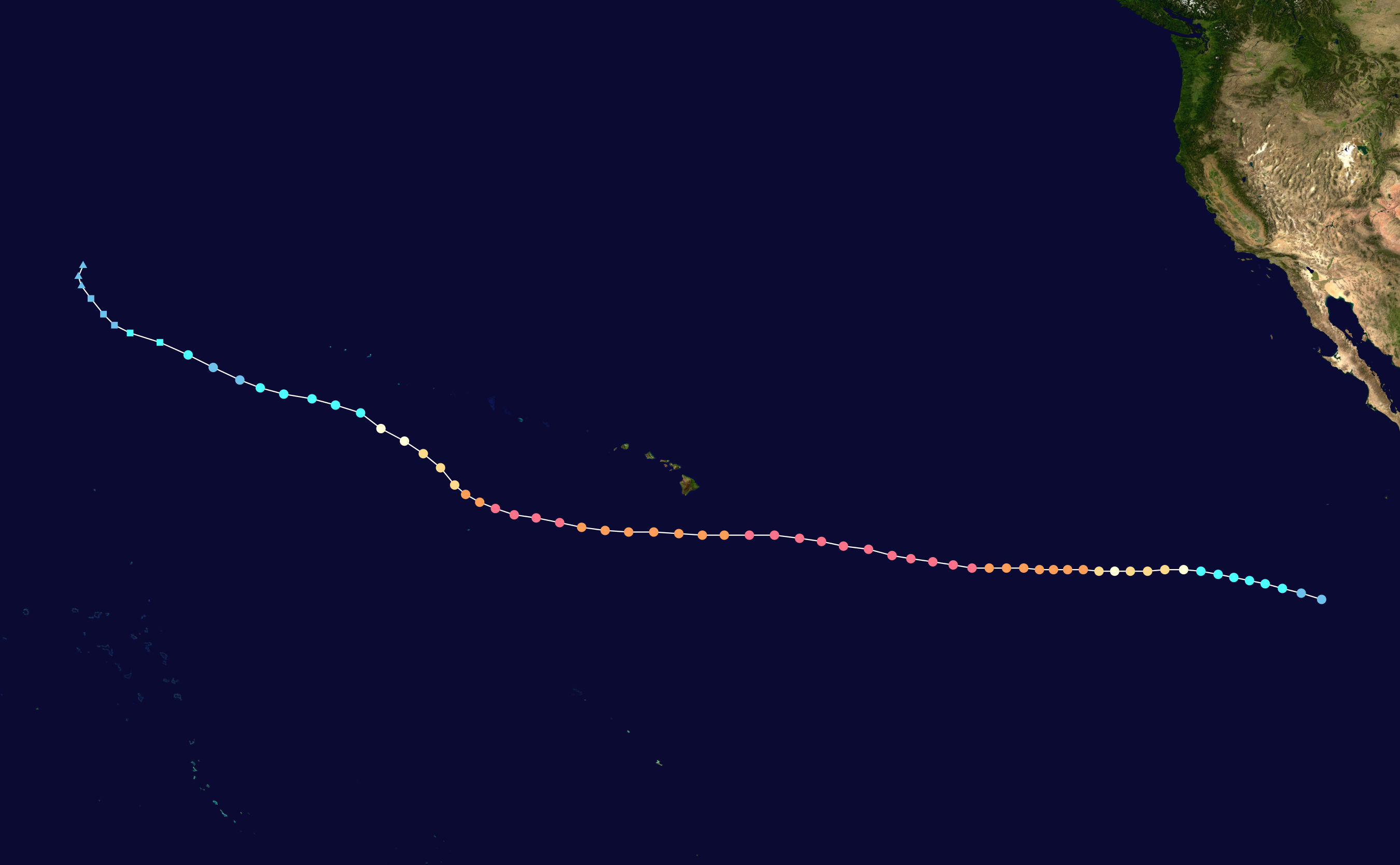
- Duration: July 31 – August 13 (Exited basin)
- Peak intensity: 155 mph (250 km/h) (1-min); 936 mbar (hPa)

A disturbance began generating thunderstorms as it traveled across northern South America. The system entered the Eastern Pacific Ocean on July 25, and a low-pressure trough formed on the next day to the south of Central America and Mexico. The trough moved westward for several days before a passing Kelvin wave improved the environment; this allowed the trough's convection to gradually become more organized. A tropical depression spawned by 12:00 UTC on July 31, about 805 mi (1,296 km) south-southwest of the southern tip of the Baja California peninsula. The depression strengthened into Tropical Storm Hector about 12 hours later, at 00:00 UTC on August 1.

Hector was steered westward during the next several days. The storm was located over warm sea surface temperatures, fueling a 30-hour period of rapid intensification. Hector reached its initial peak on August 2 at 18:00 UTC as a 105 mph (165 km/h) Category 2 hurricane. Shortly after, northerly shear abraded the northern eyewall of the hurricane before intensification resumed later on August 3. While about 1,680 mi (2,700 km) west-southwest of the southern tip of the Baja California peninsula, Hector became a Category 3 major hurricane around 00:00 UTC on August 4. After entering the Central Pacific Ocean, Hector tracked west-northwest. Hector peaked on August 6 at 18:00 UTC as a high-end Category 4 hurricane with winds of 155 mph (250 km/h) and a pressure of 936 mbar (27.64 inHg). The storm's movement gradually shifted westward over the next few days. During this time, lower sea surface temperatures and ocean heat content as well as mid-level dry air caused Hector to gradually weaken into a low-end Category 3 storm. The storm began to intensify again on the next day as a result of improving environmental conditions. Hector reached its secondary peak as a 140 mph (220 km/h) Category 4 hurricane at 18:00 UTC on August 10. Afterward, Hector tracked towards the west-northwest and later northwest. Southerly shear imparted by an upper-level low caused gradual weakening over the next few days. Hector weakened into a tropical storm around 00:00 UTC on August 13. The storm crossed the International Date Line over 12 hours later, entering the western Pacific Ocean.

Hector approached several islands on its journey through the Central Pacific Ocean, prompting the issuance of tropical storm watches and warnings for islands in Papahānaumokuākea Marine National Monument as well as Johnston Atoll. The ports of Hilo and Kawaihae closed for three days due to the hurricane, while Whittington, Punaluu, and Milolii Beach Parks were closed. At least 90 people had to be rescued on Oahu due to dangerous swells generated by the cyclone, reaching 20 ft (6.1 m) high. During Hector's track across the Eastern Pacific, it spent more consecutive days as a major hurricane than any other storm.

=== Tropical Storm Ileana ===
- Tropical storm (SSHWS)
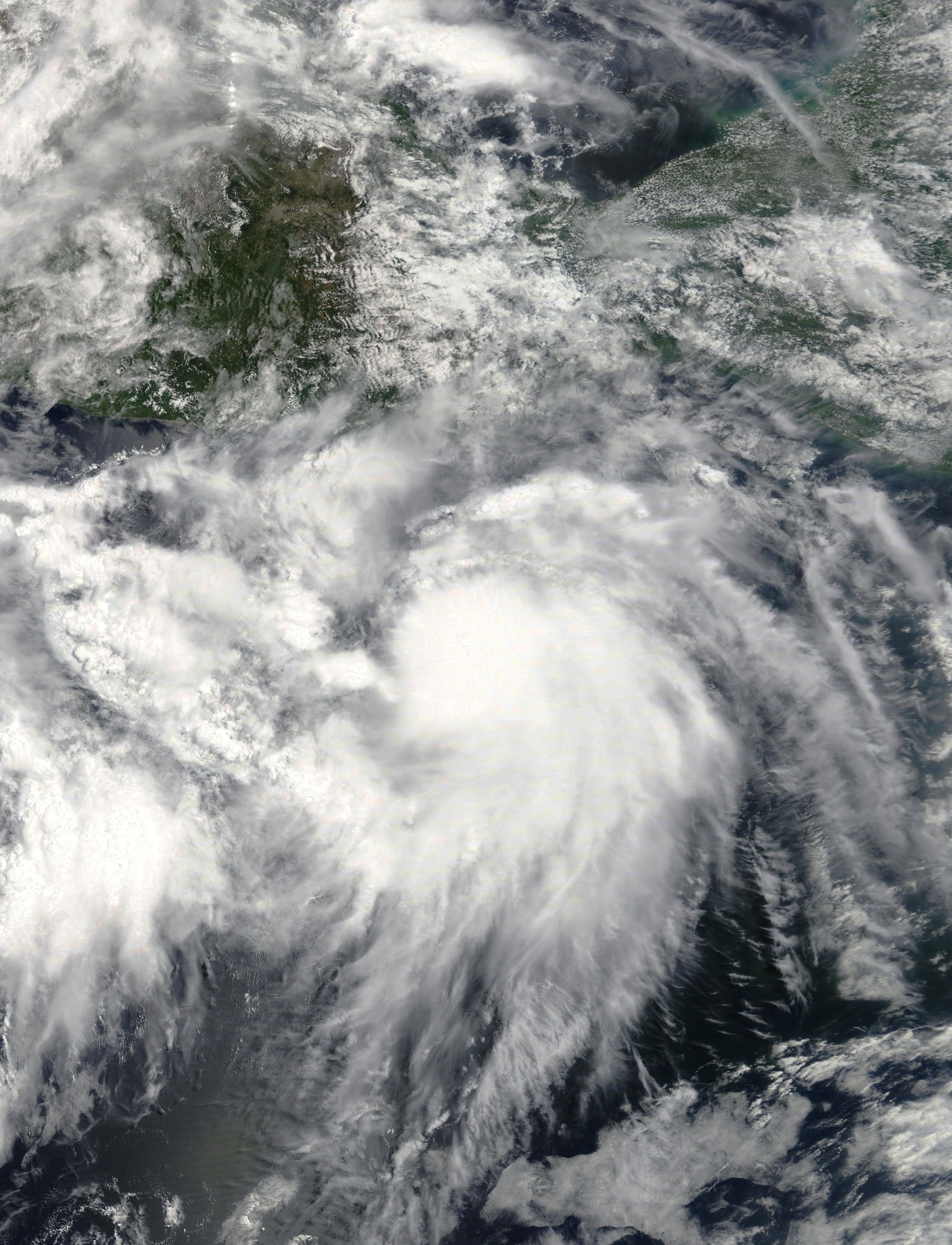
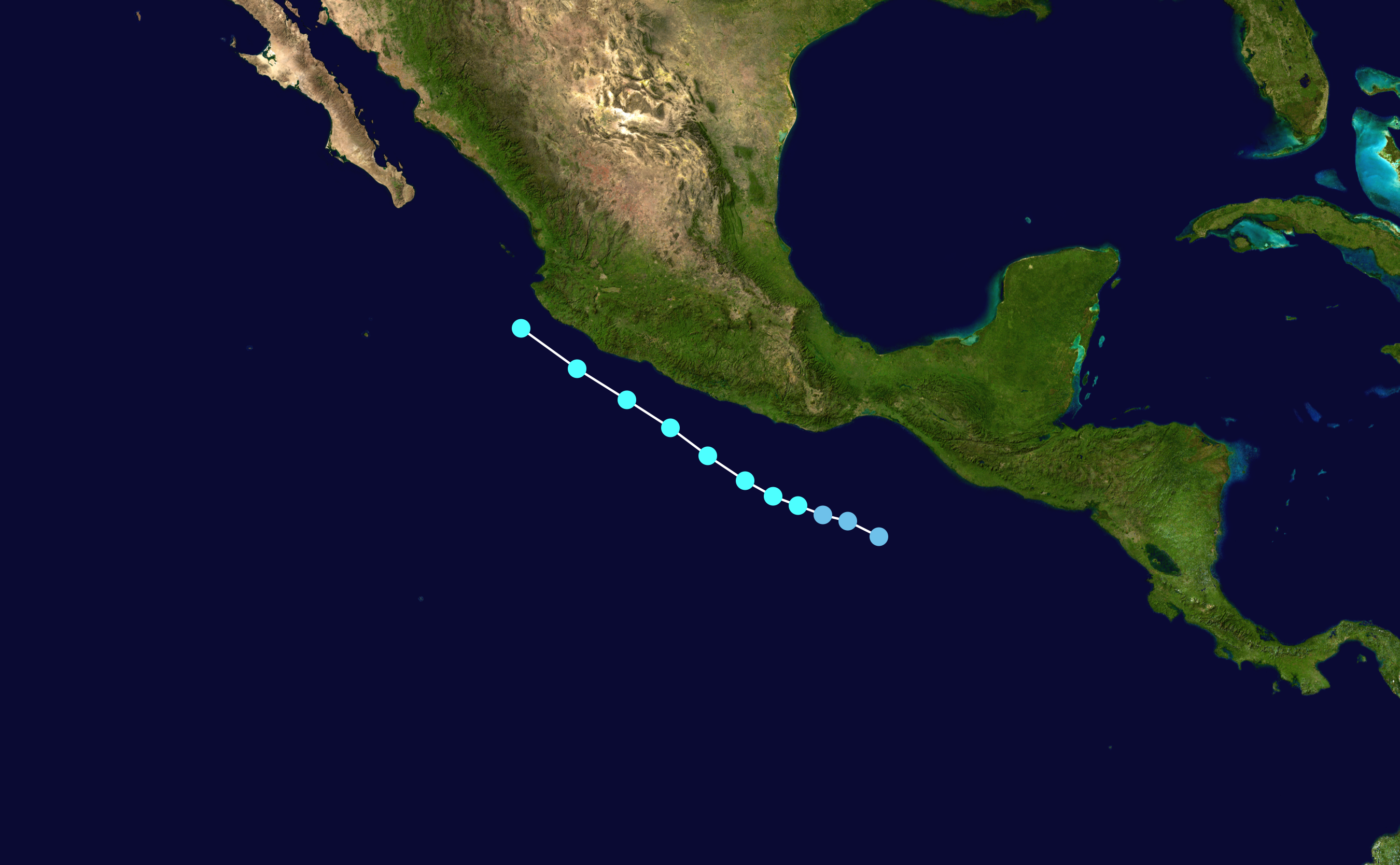
- Duration: August 4 – August 7
- Peak intensity: 65 mph (100 km/h) (1-min); 998 mbar (hPa)

A tropical wave left the western coast of Africa on July 26 with minimal convection. The wave moved across the tropics and the Caribbean Sea before traversing Central America and entering the Eastern Pacific Ocean on August 4. Despite its close proximity to the larger disturbance which later became Hurricane John, the system rapidly organized into a tropical depression by 18:00 UTC, 230 mi (370 km) south-southeast of Puerto Ángel, Mexico. The larger disturbance imparted northwesterly wind shear, uncovering the low-level center and preventing further intensification for multiple hours. Despite the shear, a central dense overcast soon developed near the depression's center. The system was upgraded into Tropical Storm Ileana around 12:00 UTC on August 5. Warm sea surface temperatures allowed Ileana to strengthen further as it tracked west-northwest, just off the southwestern coast of Mexico. Ileana reached its peak intensity at 12:00 UTC on August 6 with winds of 65 miles per hour (105 km/h) and a pressure of 998 mbar (29.47 inHg), while located 115 mi (185 km) southwest of Acapulco. A combination of disruption from Hurricane John located to the west, as well as the Sierra Madre mountains, caused the storm's structure to decay over the next day. Ileana was absorbed into John's outer bands around 12:00 UTC on August 7, just off the coast from Cabo Corrientes, Mexico.

Tropical Storm Ileana's close proximity to the Mexican coast prompted the issuance of tropical cyclone watches and warnings. Ileana impacted multiple states, causing damaging floods and eight deaths. The storm caused flooding, which inundated houses and streets, as well as power outages in the state of Guerrero. Ileana left a total of four people dead in the state. In the nearby state of Oaxaca, rainfall peaking at 7.72 in (196 mm) caused a landslide that destroyed a house. Another four individuals were killed within the state of Chiapas. The cyclone caused US$737,000 (MX$13.6 million) in damage to roads in Michoacán.

=== Hurricane John ===
- Category 2 hurricane (SSHWS)
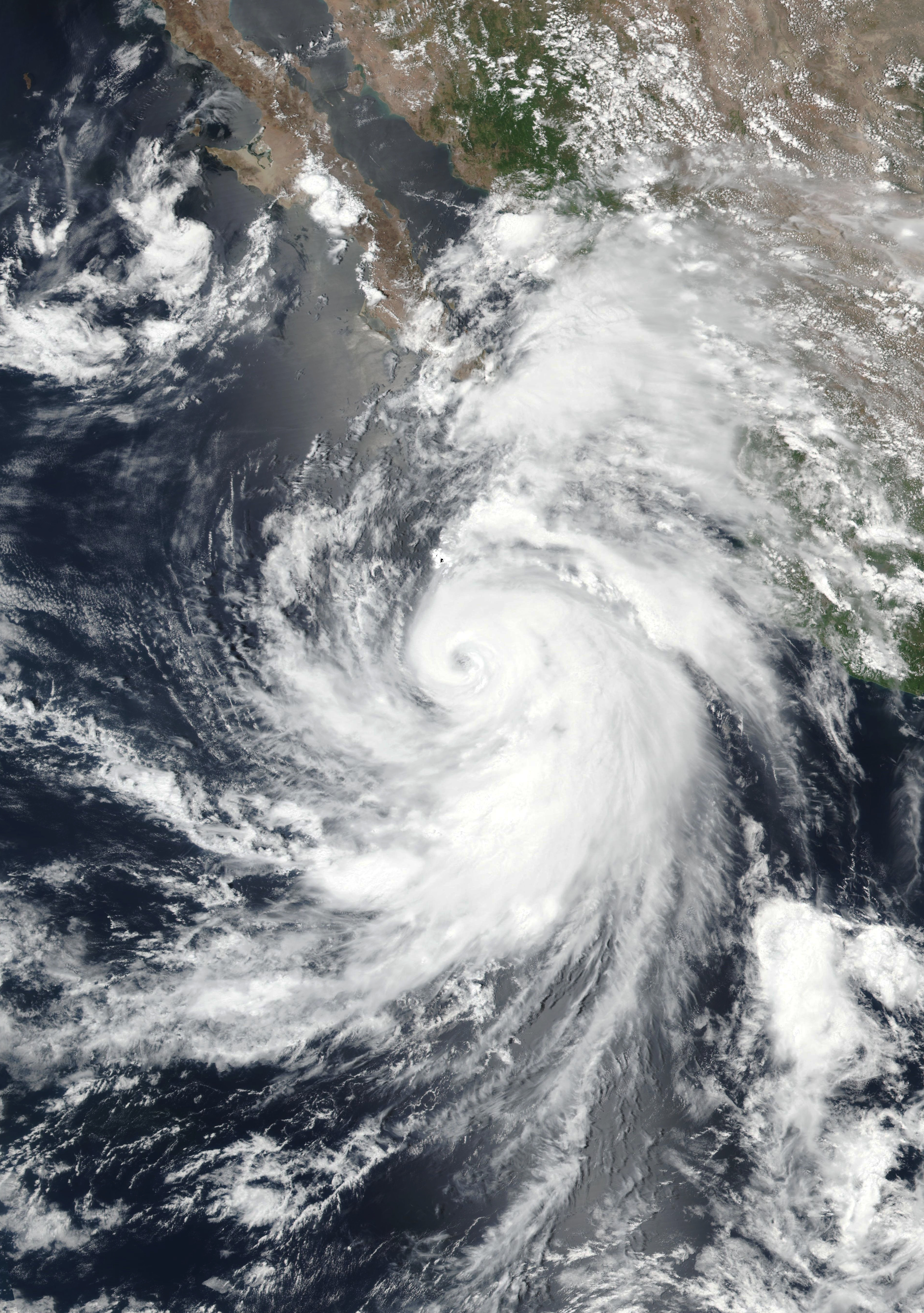
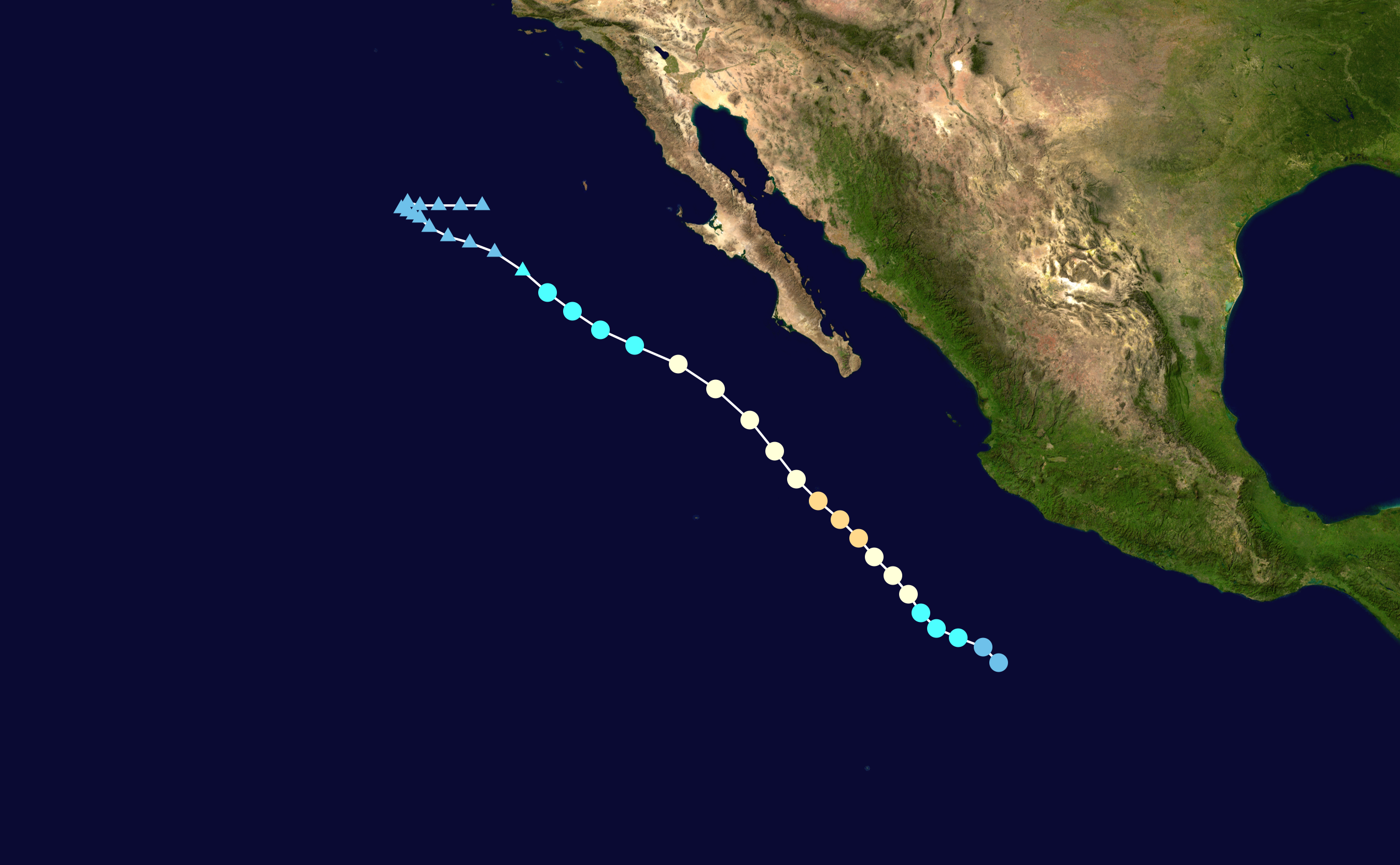
- Duration: August 5 – August 10
- Peak intensity: 110 mph (175 km/h) (1-min); 964 mbar (hPa)

An enervated tropical wave departed from the western coast of Africa on July 25. It then traveled westward across the tropical Atlantic, with most of its convection located within the ITCZ until it arrived at South America on July 30. The wave entered the Eastern Pacific two days later and convection drastically increased as a result of the active portion of the Madden–Julian oscillation. An area of low pressure formed on August 4 and became more organized over the day. A tropical depression formed around 12:00 UTC on August 5, about 335 mi (540 km) south-southwest of Manzanillo, Mexico. The depression then strengthened into Tropical Storm John about 12 hours later as it traveled along the edge of a mid-level ridge, which was located over Mexico. A period of rapid intensification ensued as a result of John being located in a favorable environment of low wind shear, warm sea surface temperatures, and a high quantity of mid-level moisture. John peaked on August 7 at 18:00 UTC as a Category 2 hurricane with winds of 110 mph (175 km/h) and a pressure of 964 mbar (28.47 inHg), while it approached Socorro Island. A combination of increasing northwesterly wind shear and cooling sea surface temperatures caused John to fall below hurricane strength on August 9. Convection quickly dissipated near the center of the cyclone, causing it to be downgraded to a post-tropical system by 12:00 UTC on August 10, approximately 345 mi (555 km) west-southwest of Punta Eugenia, Mexico. The remnants continued northwestward and later eastward, before opening into a trough of low-pressure around 18:00 UTC on August 13, about 405 mi (650 km) west of Punta Eugenia.

Although John never made landfall, 46,450 people in Mexico were affected and 500 houses were damaged. Damage across the nation totaled Mex$16.7 million (US$905,000). John later produced high surf along the coastlines of Baja California Sur and Southern California.

=== Tropical Storm Kristy ===
- Tropical storm (SSHWS)
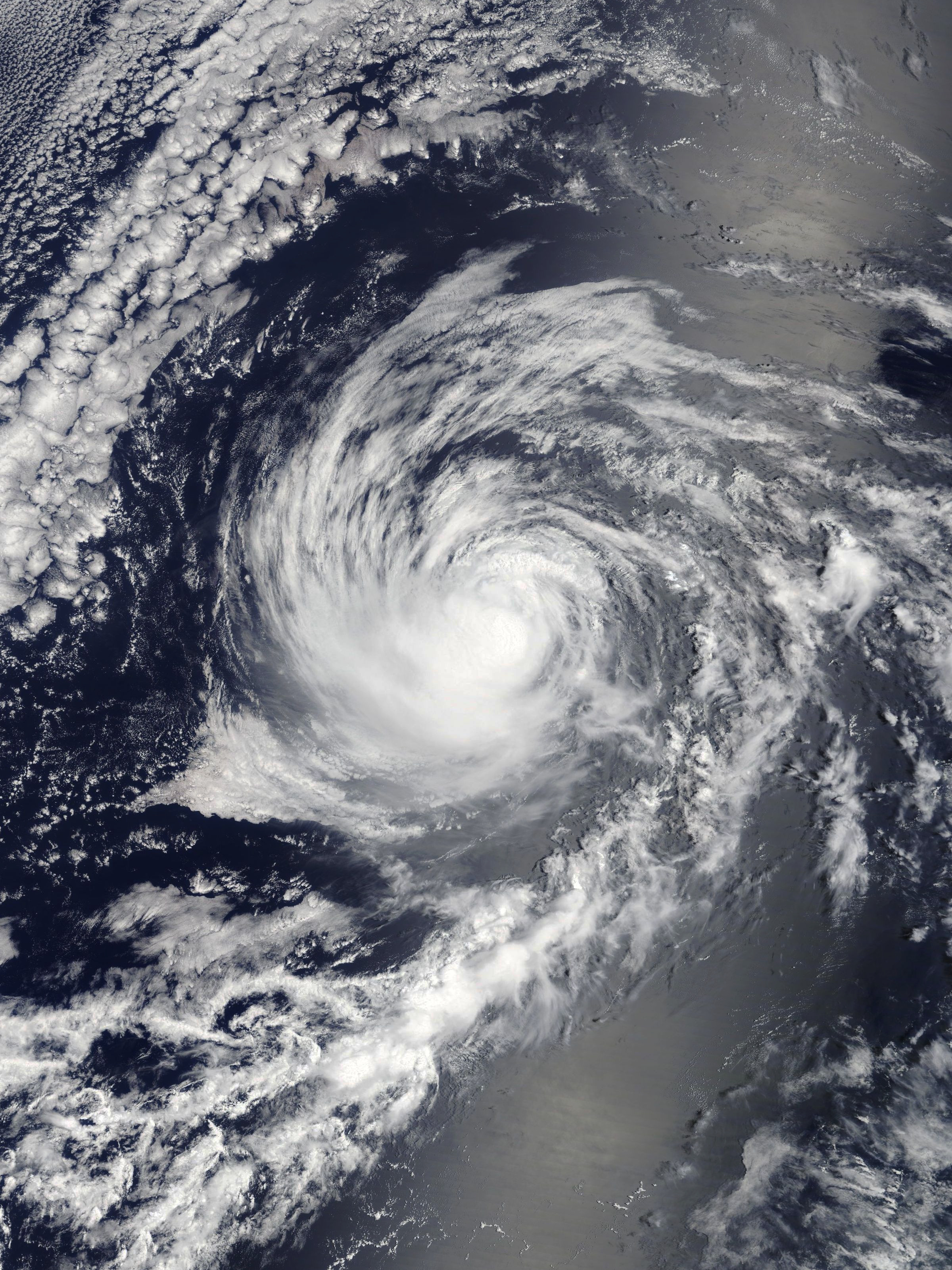
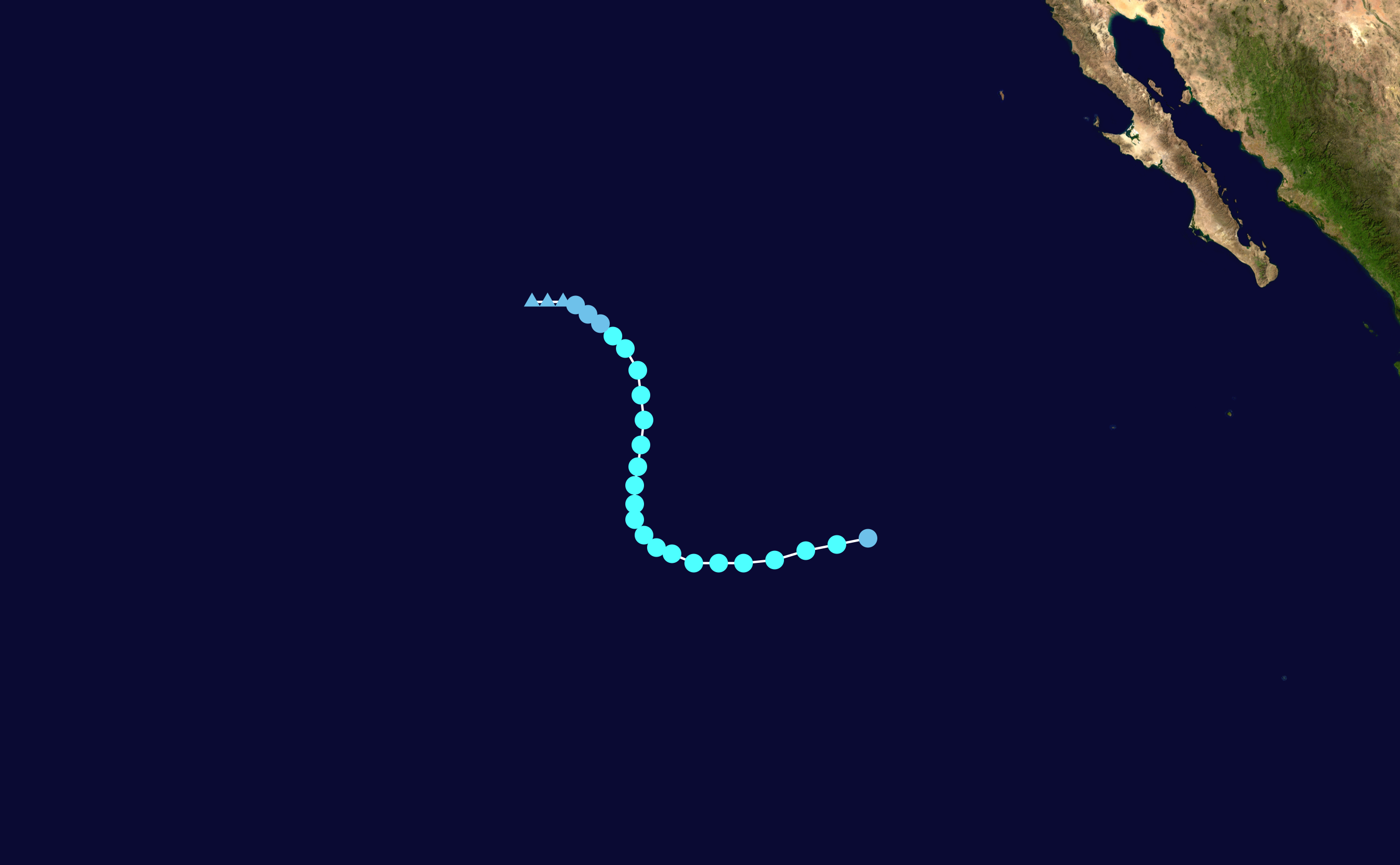
- Duration: August 6 – August 12
- Peak intensity: 70 mph (110 km/h) (1-min); 991 mbar (hPa)

A tropical wave departed from the western coast of Africa on July 22 and traveled quickly across the Atlantic Ocean and the Caribbean Sea. The wave remained without convection until it entered the Caribbean Sea and moved over South America from July 27–29. Convection began to increase overland before the wave crossed into the Eastern Pacific on July 29–30. Continuing westward, the system slowly organized over the next several days, exhibiting intermittent convection and improving cloud cover. Deep convection increased near the system's center on August 6, resulting in the formation of a tropical depression by 18:00 UTC. The depression strengthened into Tropical Storm Kristy six hours later, approximately 1,035 mi (1,666 km) west-southwest of the southern tip of the Baja California peninsula. During August 7, Kristy became embedded within deep-layer easterlies affiliated with a subtropical ridge which was located to the northeast; this steered the storm westward. The storm continued to increase in organization because it was located within a favorable environment of warm sea surface temperatures and low wind shear. An upper-level low located to the northwest imparted northwesterly wind shear and dry air, causing Kristy to weaken slightly late on August 7.

Hurricane John eroded the subtropical ridge on August 8, causing Kristy to track towards the northwest. The storm resumed strengthening on the same day as wind shear decreased. Kristy peaked on August 10 at 06:00 UTC with 70 mph (110 km/h) winds and a pressure of 991 mbar (29.26 inHg). The cyclone maintained this intensity for around 12 hours before wind shear increased once more and sea surface temperatures cooled. This caused Kristy to rapidly weaken to a tropical depression by 12:00 UTC on August 11. While the storm lost most of its convection as it weakened, it still produced bursts of convection. Kristy was downgraded to a remnant low on August 12 at 12:00 UTC after having been devoid of convection. The remnants then traveled westward as a swirl of low-level clouds before dissipating on August 13.

=== Hurricane Lane ===
- Category 5 hurricane (SSHWS)
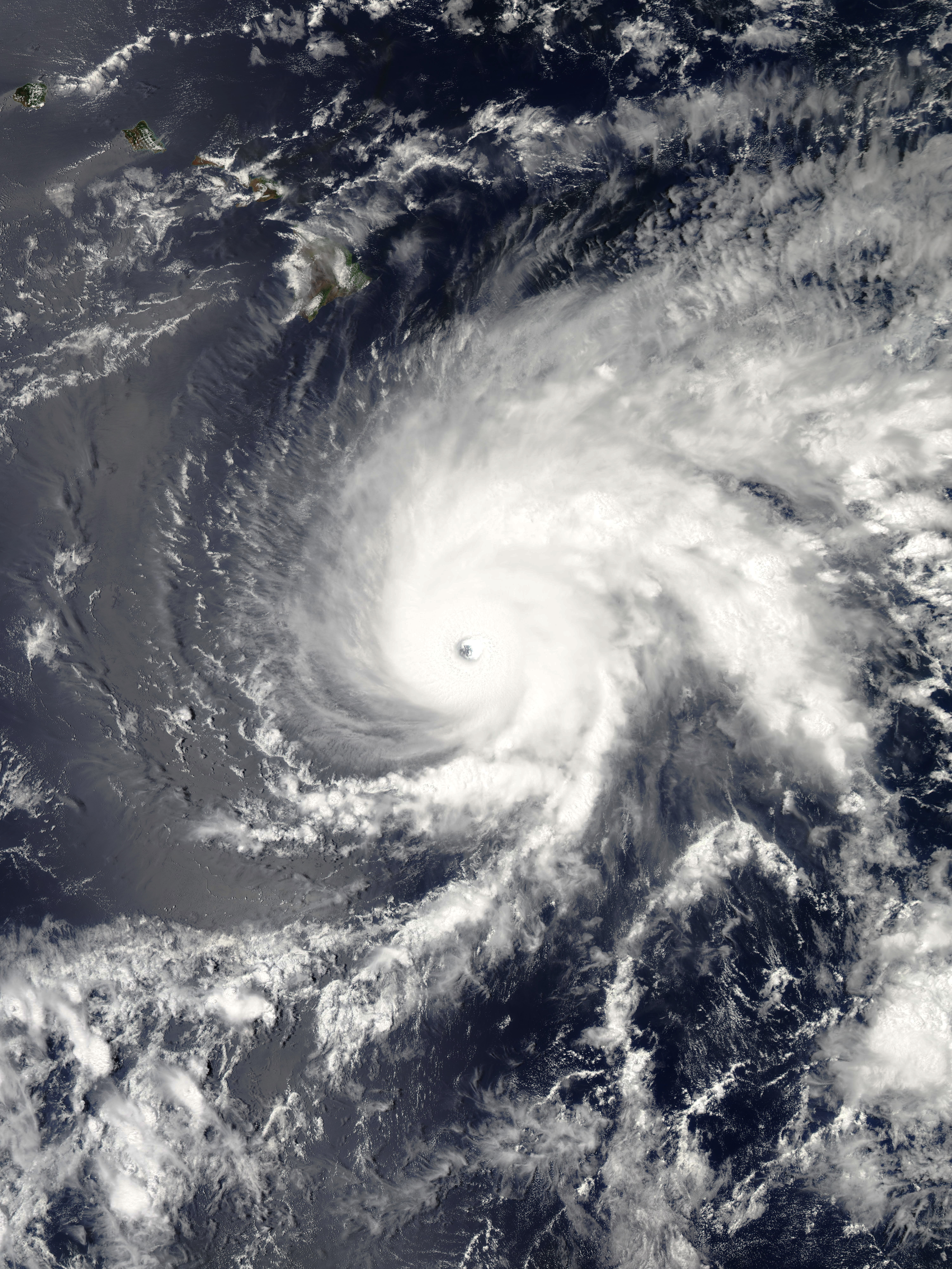
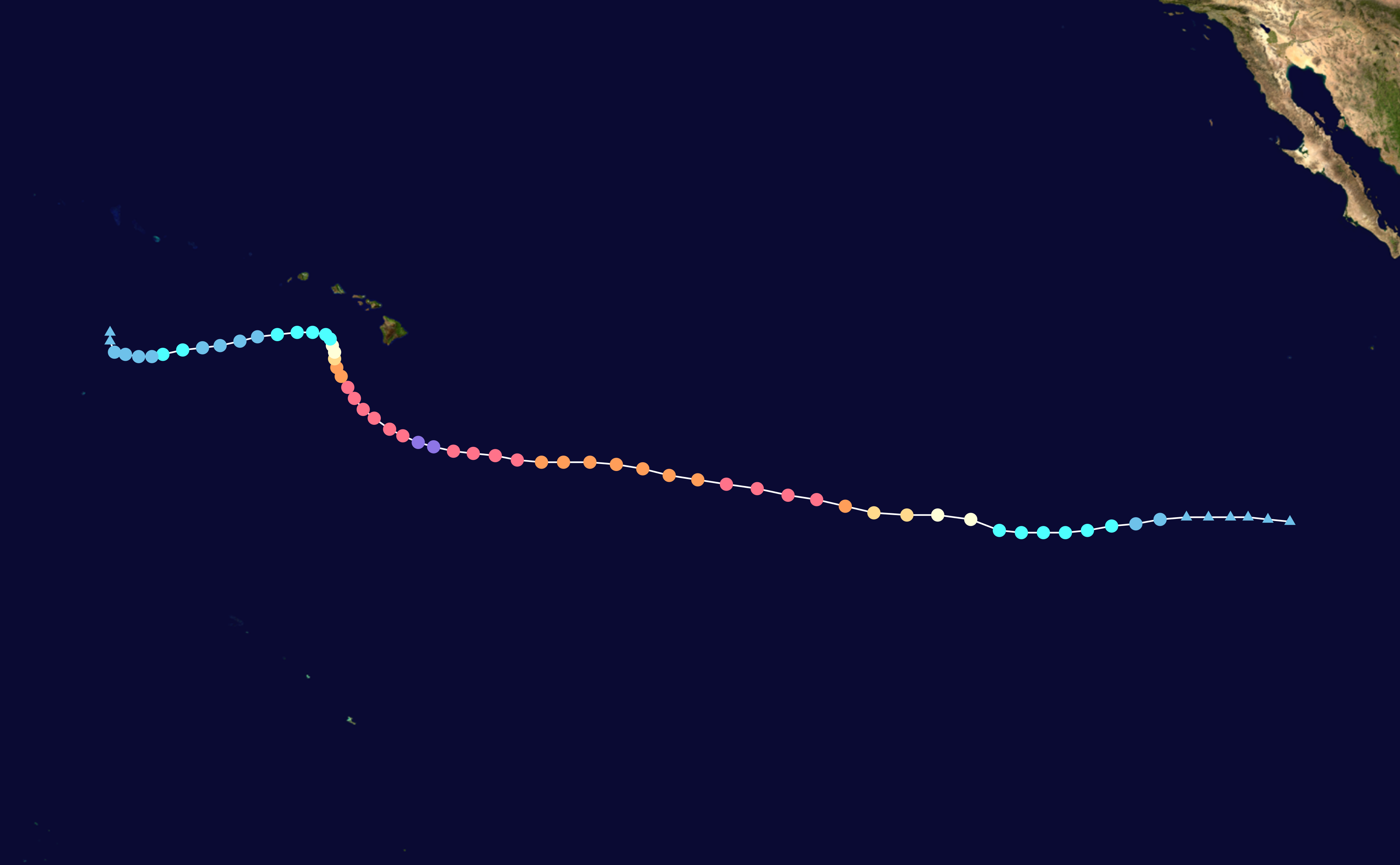
- Duration: August 15 – August 28
- Peak intensity: 160 mph (260 km/h) (1-min); 926 mbar (hPa)

A tropical depression formed on August 15 from a tropical wave, about 1,075 mi (1,730 km) southwest of the southern tip of the Baja California peninsula. Moving westward, it strengthened into Tropical Storm Lane. With warm waters, low wind shear, and moisture, Lane rapidly strengthened, becoming a hurricane on August 17, and a Category 4 major hurricane by the next day. Lane weakened due to wind shear, but intensified on August 20 after it subsided. The storm peaked around 06:00 UTC on August 22 as a Category 5 hurricane with winds of 160 miles per hour (260 km/h) and a pressure of 926 mbar (27.34 inHg); this intensity made Lane the fifth storm to achieve Category 5 status in the Central Pacific in recorded history. Over the next few days, Lane weakened as it tracked north-northwest into a region of high wind shear. The cyclone moved around the western edge of a mid-level ridge, shifting its track northward; at its closest point to the state of Hawaii, Lane was about 150 mi (240 km) away from most islands. The cyclone weakened below Category 3 status early on August 24 and then rapidly weakened into a tropical storm by 06:00 UTC on August 25. The storm then turned westward, away from the Hawaiian Islands, while continuing to weaken. Lane fell to tropical depression status by 12:00 UTC on August 26, and became a tropical storm again a day later despite the shear. Lane weakened into a remnant low by 00:00 UTC on August 29, while 185 mi (300 km) north-northeast of Johnston Atoll. The remnants traveled northward and dispersed 12 hours later.

Hurricane Lane warranted the issuance of tropical cyclone watches and warnings for the Hawaiian Islands as it remained in close proximity to them for multiple days. Although the core of Lane remained off-shore, the hurricane dropped a record 58 in (1,473 mm) in Akaka Falls State Park on Hawaii's Big Island. This made Lane the wettest tropical cyclone on record for the state of Hawaii; it is also second wettest in the United States, behind 2017's Hurricane Harvey. Landslides on the Big Island covered highways and destroyed multiple homes. Rivers exceeded their banks, flooding homes and necessitating the rescue of 100 people. The excessive rainfall caused sewer pipes to overflow, dumping 9 million US gallons (30 million liters) of raw sewage into Hilo Bay. Damage on the island totaled about US$25 million. Windgusts from the cyclone sparked wildfires in the Kauaula Valley on Maui, burning 2,800 acres (11 km^{2}) and causing over US$4.3 million in damage. A man drowned in a river near Koloa on Kauaʻi. Overall, the total losses from Lane exceeded US$250 million. President Donald Trump signed a disaster declaration on September 27 for all counties except Honolulu, allowing FEMA to provide about US$10 million in aid. The Hawaii County Council used US$10 million from its budget to help repair county facilities; the cost to repair roads and bridges was estimated at US$35 million.

=== Hurricane Miriam ===
- Category 2 hurricane (SSHWS)
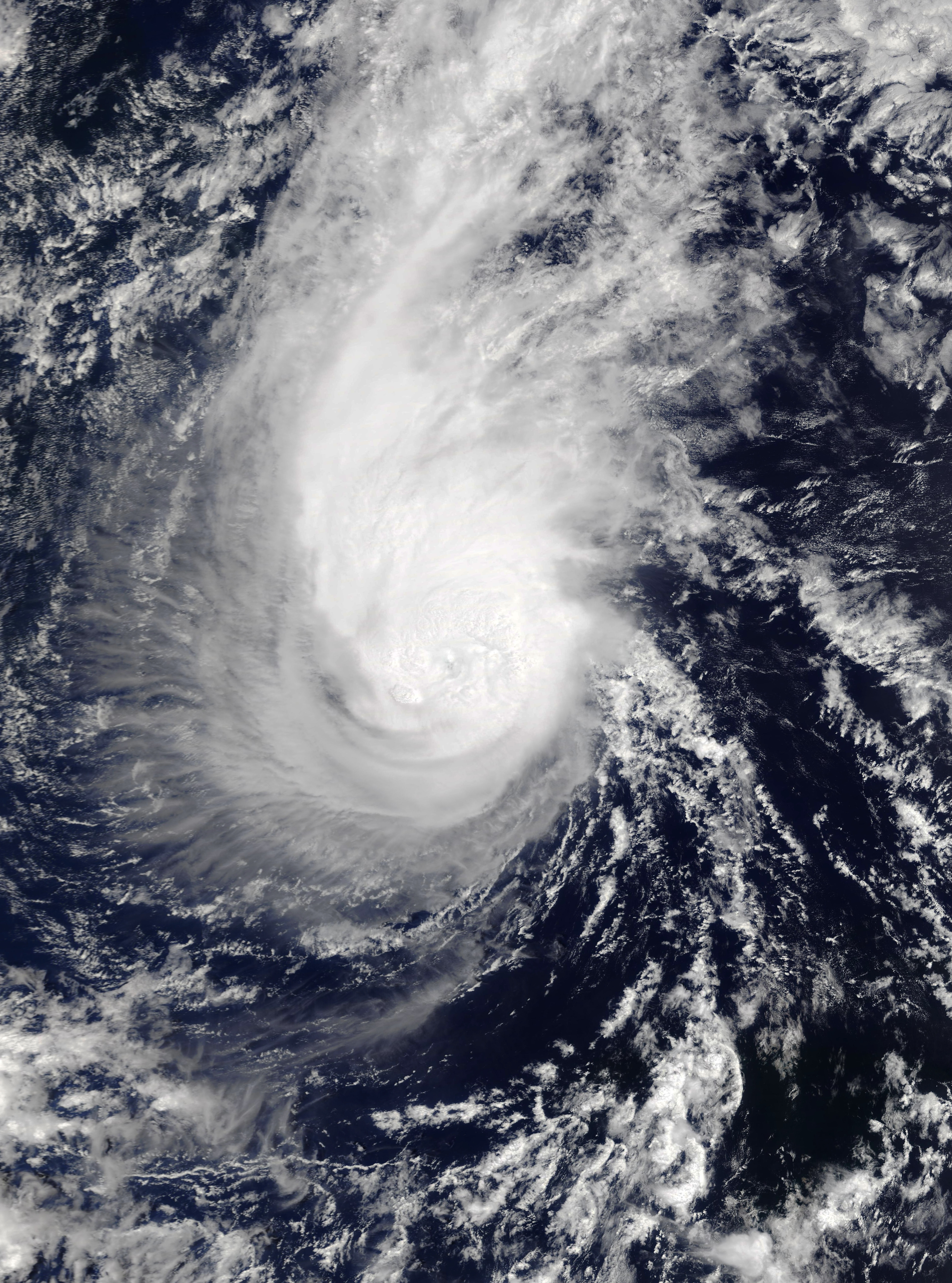
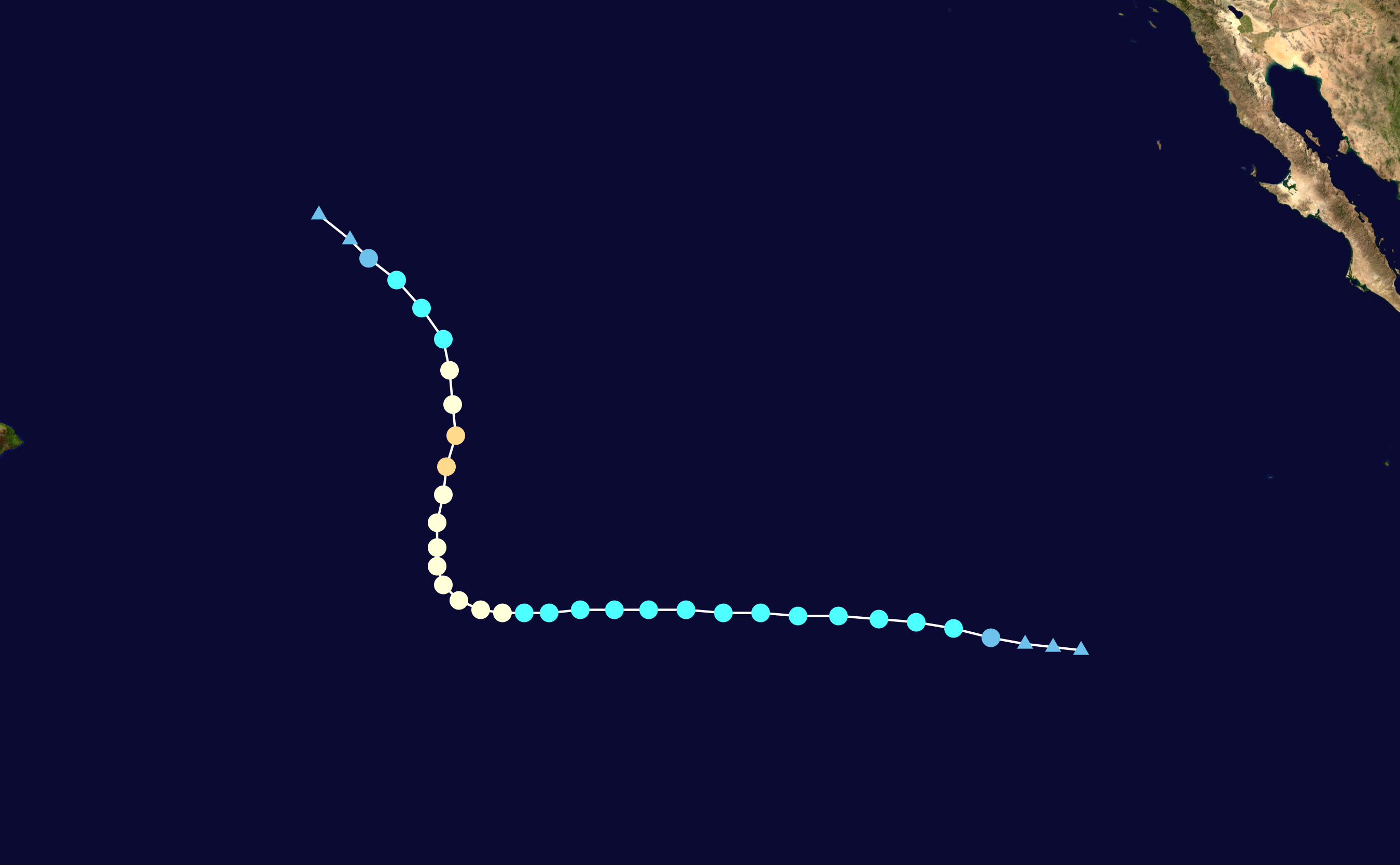
- Duration: August 26 – September 2
- Peak intensity: 100 mph (155 km/h) (1-min); 974 mbar (hPa)

A tropical wave departed from the western coast of Africa on August 14 and traveled westward with minimal convection. Thunderstorm activity increased by August 15–16 before dwindling as the wave encountered drier, stabler air as well as easterly wind shear. The wave moved across the southern Windward Islands, northern South America, and the southern Caribbean Sea before crossing into the Pacific Ocean on August 20. The wave then entered a favorable environment which caused convection to increase. The system gradually organized over the next several days as it tracked west-northwest. A tropical depression spawned around 06:00 UTC on August 26, approximately 1,130 mi (1,820 km) west-southwest of the southern tip of the Baja California peninsula. The depression strengthened into Tropical Storm Miriam six hours later.

Embedded within a favorable environment of moist air, low wind shear, and 82 °F (28 °C) sea surface temperatures, Miriam strengthened to 65 miles per hour (105 km/h) by 12:00 UTC on August 27, while located 1,485 mi (2,390 km) west-southwest of the southern tip of the Baja California peninsula. The storm encountered moderate northwesterly wind shear after turning westward later in the day; this caused Miriam's intensification to halt. Two days later, the wind shear subsided, allowing convection to reignite around Miriam's uncovered low-level center. Miriam became a hurricane at 18:00 UTC on August 29, while around 1,035 mi (1,666 km) east-southeast of Hilo, Hawaii; the system entered the Central Pacific about six hours later. Soon after, the cyclone was forced northwestward and later northward between a mid-level ridge which was located over the southwestern United States and an upper-level trough which was located northeast of Hawaii. Miriam peaked at 18:00 UTC on August 31 as a Category 2 hurricane with winds of 100 miles per hour (160 km/h) and a pressure of 974 mbar (28.76 inHg), while 910 mi (1,460 km) east of Hilo, Hawaii. Shortly after peaking, high southwesterly wind shear and cooling sea surface temperatures caused Miriam to rapidly weaken. The cyclone fell to tropical storm status by 18:00 UTC on September 1 as its low-level center became entirely vulnerable. Wind shear increased even further, preventing the reformation of convection near the storm's center. Miriam weakened into a tropical depression by 12:00 UTC on September 2 and was downgraded to a remnant low six hours later while more than 805 mi (1,296 km) northeast of the Hawaiian Islands. The low continued northwest before opening up into a trough around 06:00 UTC on September 3.

=== Hurricane Norman ===
- Category 4 hurricane (SSHWS)
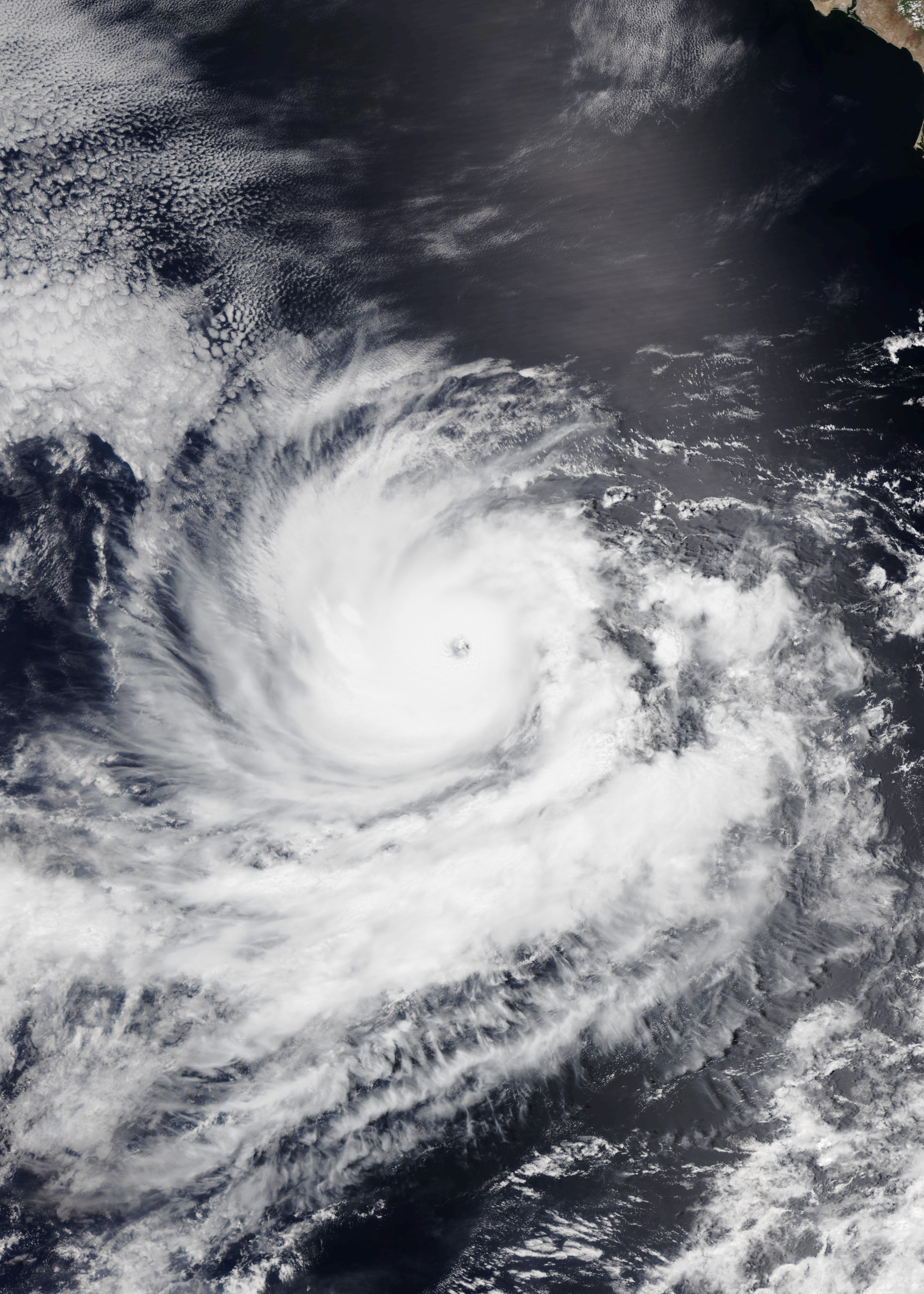
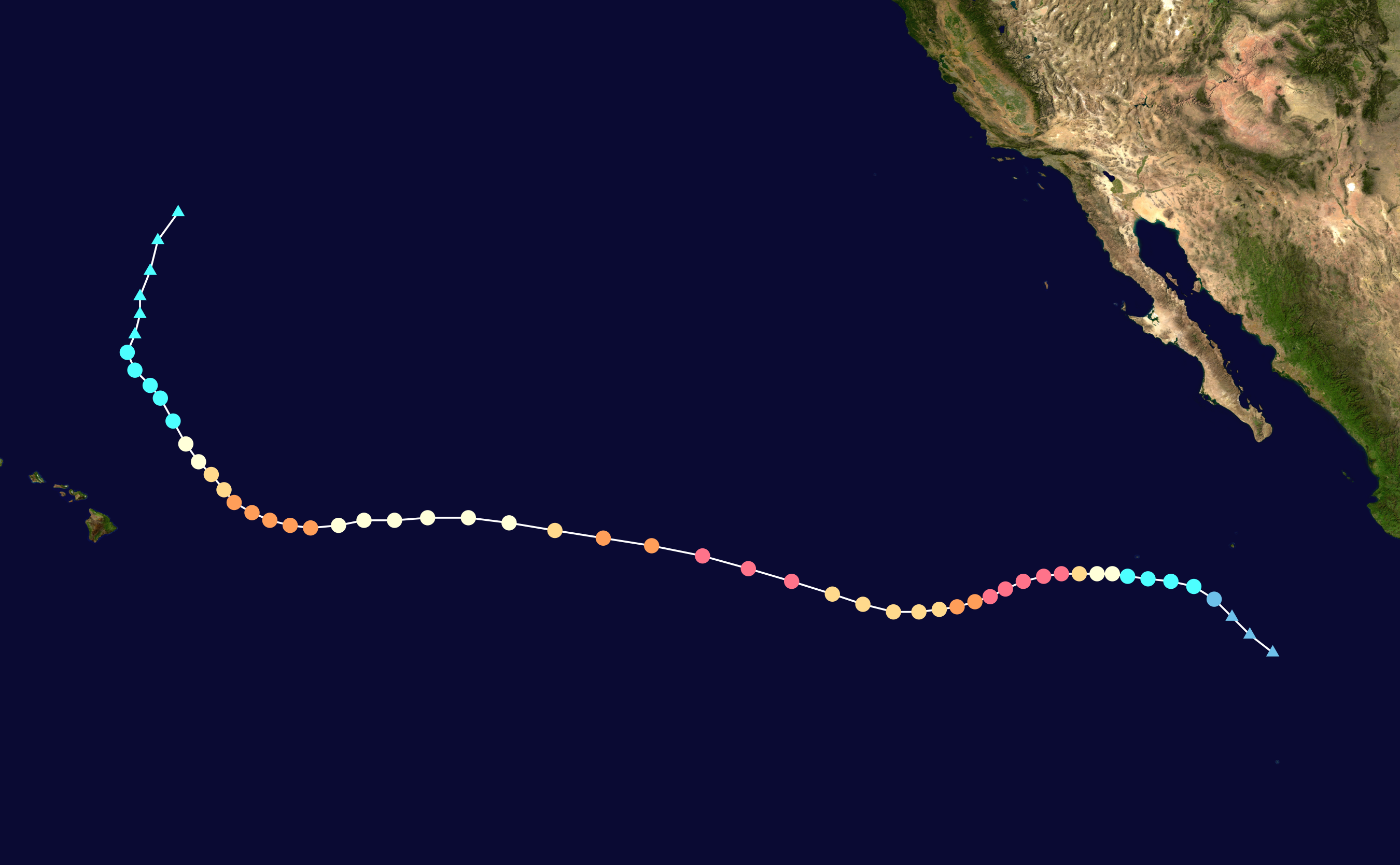
- Duration: August 28 – September 8
- Peak intensity: 150 mph (240 km/h) (1-min); 937 mbar (hPa)

A tropical wave exited western Africa on August 14 and reached the eastern Pacific eight days later. Convection organized around a low pressure area, developing into a tropical depression on August 28 about 490 mi (790 km) west-southwest of Manzanillo, Mexico. The depression strengthened into Tropical Storm Norman about six hours later. Moving west-northwestward, Norman encountered warm waters, low wind shear, and moist air, allowing it to rapidly intensify. It attained hurricane status on August 29, and a day later it attained peak winds of 150 miles per hour (240 km/h) and a pressure of 937 mbar (27.67 inHg), while 520 mi (835 km) southwest of the southern tip of the Baja California peninsula. This made it a Category 4 hurricane. Norman turned to the west-southwest and encountered increased wind shear, causing it to weaken. After it fell to Category 2 status, Norman restrengthened when the shear relaxed. It reached its secondary peak late on September 2 as a Category 4 hurricane of 140 mph (230 km/h).

Soon after, the hurricane began to weaken once more as it traveled through a region of cooler sea surface temperatures. Norman crossed into the Central Pacific after 00:00 UTC on September 4 as a high-end Category 1 hurricane. The weakening trend continued as Norman tracked westward under the influence of a subtropical ridge that was located to the north and northeast. The hurricane began a third period of rapid intensification as it moved across warmer waters and an lower wind shear. Norman reached its tertiary peak intensity on September 5 at 18:00 UTC as a 120 mph (190 km/h) Category 3 hurricane. On the next day, cooler waters and stronger shear caused Norman to weaken as it turned northwest. By 18:00 UTC on September 7, Norman had weakened into a tropical storm to the northeast of Hawaii. Wind shear further increased as the system turned northward, exposing the low-level center and prompting more weakening. Norman was downgraded to a post-tropical cyclone around 00:00 UTC on September 9. The remnants turned northeastward and dissipated on September 10 by 12:00 UTC, around 805 mi (1,296 km) north-northeast of the Hawaiian Islands.

=== Hurricane Olivia ===
- Category 4 hurricane (SSHWS)
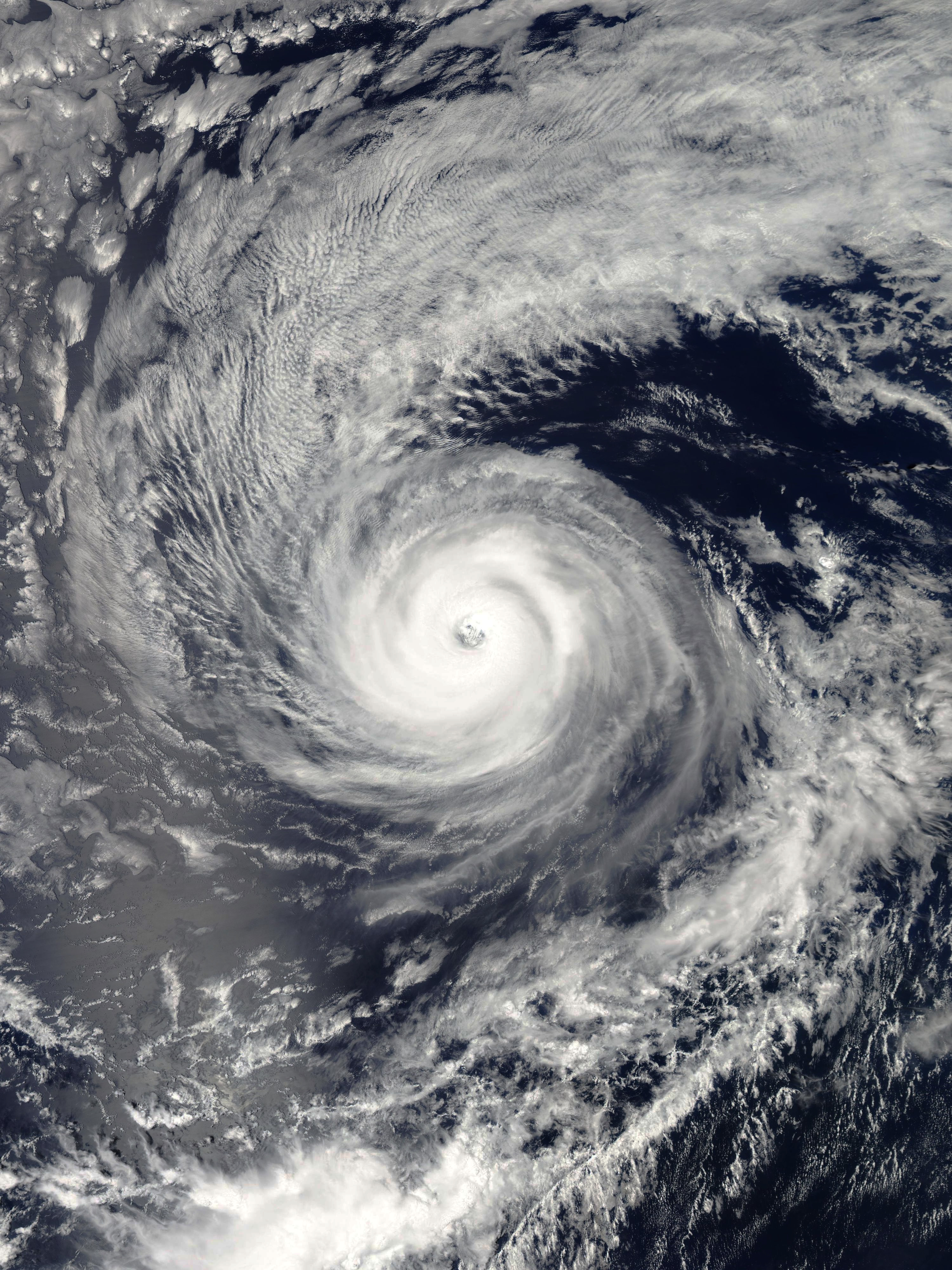
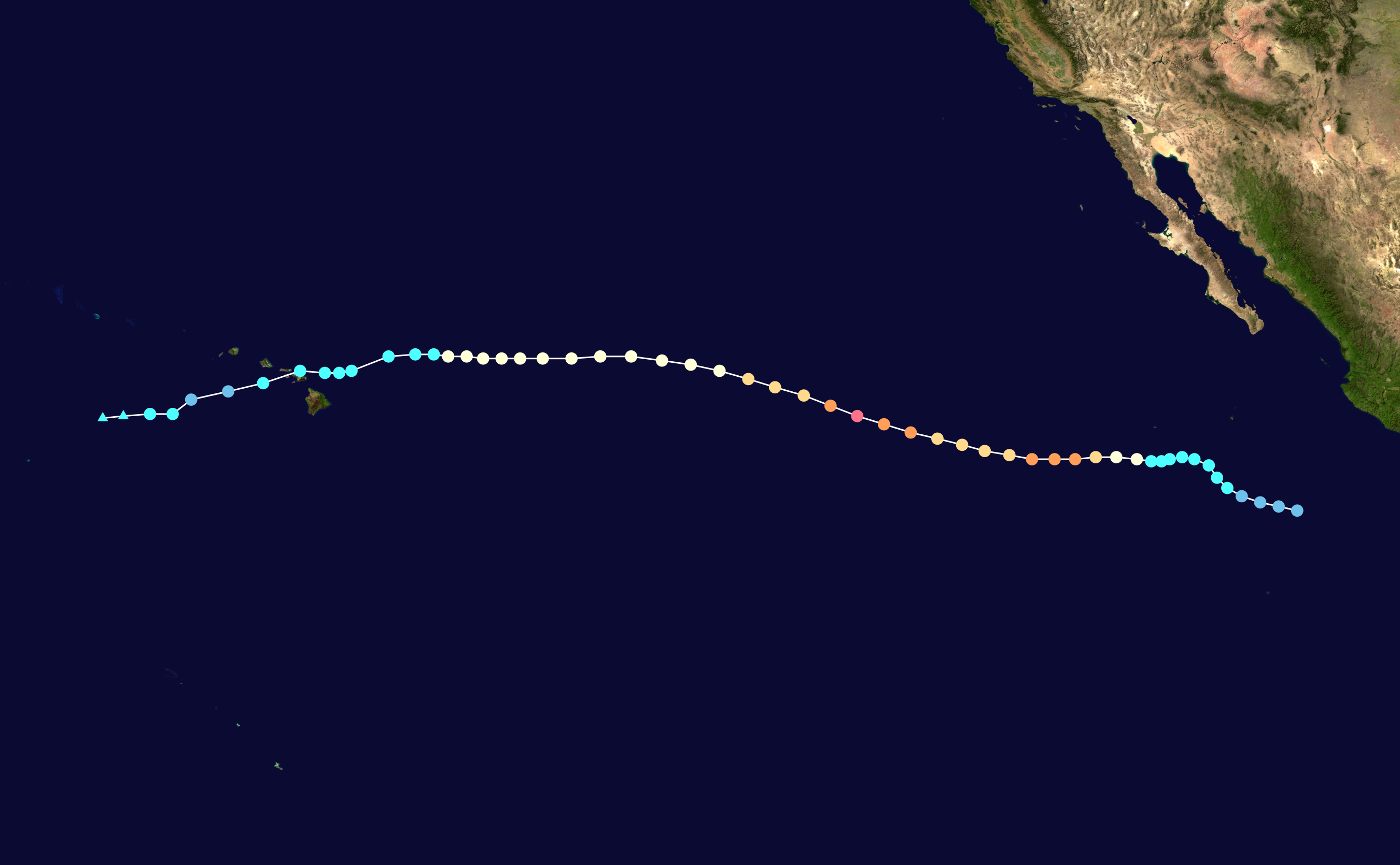
- Duration: September 1 – September 14
- Peak intensity: 130 mph (215 km/h) (1-min); 951 mbar (hPa)

A tropical depression formed on September 1, approximately 405 mi (650 km) southwest of Manzanillo, Mexico. Despite wind shear, the depression strengthened into Tropical Storm Olivia a day after forming. It moved to the northwest and later to the west. Olivia reached hurricane intensity on September 4 at 00:00 UTC, while located 575 mi (925 km) southwest of Cabo San Lucas. On the next day, it reached an initial peak as a Category 3 hurricane, before weakening due to wind shear and dry air. Olivia unexpectedly restrengthened, attaining peak winds of 130 miles per hour (210 km/h) and a pressure of 951 mbar (28.08 inHg) on September 7. This made it a Category 4 hurricane. Olivia weakened again due to cooler waters, falling to tropical storm strength on September 11 as it neared eastern Hawaii. Olivia made landfall as a 45 miles per hour (72 km/h) tropical storm at 19:10 UTC on September 12, about 10 mi (15 km) northwest of Kahului, Maui. Just over 40 minutes later, the storm made a second landfall about 5 mi (8.0 km) north-northwest of Lanai City. Olivia's two landfalls were the first time in recorded history that a tropical cyclone had made landfall on both islands. The storm moved west-southwestward, away from the Hawaiian Islands, and weakened into a tropical depression on September 13 at 06:00 UTC. Olivia briefly became a tropical storm once more, but it transitioned into a post-tropical cyclone on September 14, shortly before opening into a trough.

Olivia's approach towards the Hawaiian Islands prompted the issuance of tropical storm watches and warnings for Hawaii County, Oahu, Maui County, and Kauaʻi County. Hawaii Governor David Ige declared Hawaii, Maui, Kalawao, Kauai, and Honolulu counties disaster areas prior to Olivia's landfall in order to activate emergency disaster funds and management. Olivia made brief landfalls in northwest Maui and Lanai on September 12, becoming the first tropical cyclone to impact the islands in recorded history. Tropical-storm-force winds mainly affected Maui County and Oahu. Torrential rainfall occurred on both Maui and Oahu, peaking at 12.93 in (328 mm) in West Wailuaiki, Maui. On Maui, Olivia felled trees, caused thousands of power outages, and caused severe flooding. In Honokohau Valley, the Honokohau stream rose over 15 ft (4.6 m), submerging a bridge and inundating over a dozen homes. Multiple homes and vehicles were swept away by floodwaters. Olivia left the valley without potable water for more than a week. Several hundred power outages occurred on Molokai, and around 1,100 lost power in Honolulu. A pipe overflowed from excessive rainfall on Oahu, sending raw sewage into Kapalama Stream and Honolulu Harbor. President Donald Trump issued a disaster declaration for Hawaii to aid with emergency response efforts. Olivia caused a total of US$25 million in damage throughout Hawaii.

=== Tropical Storm Paul ===
- Tropical storm (SSHWS)
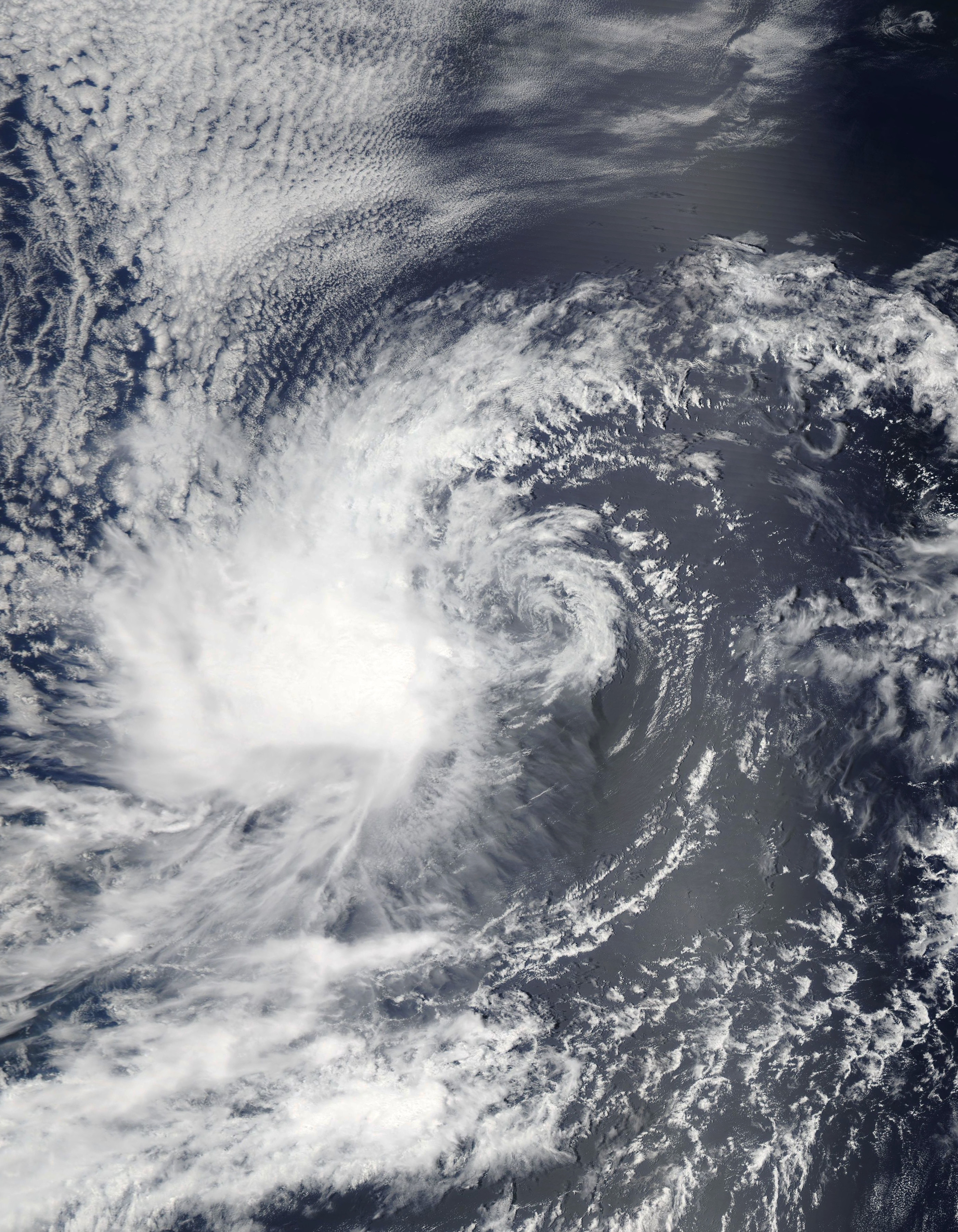
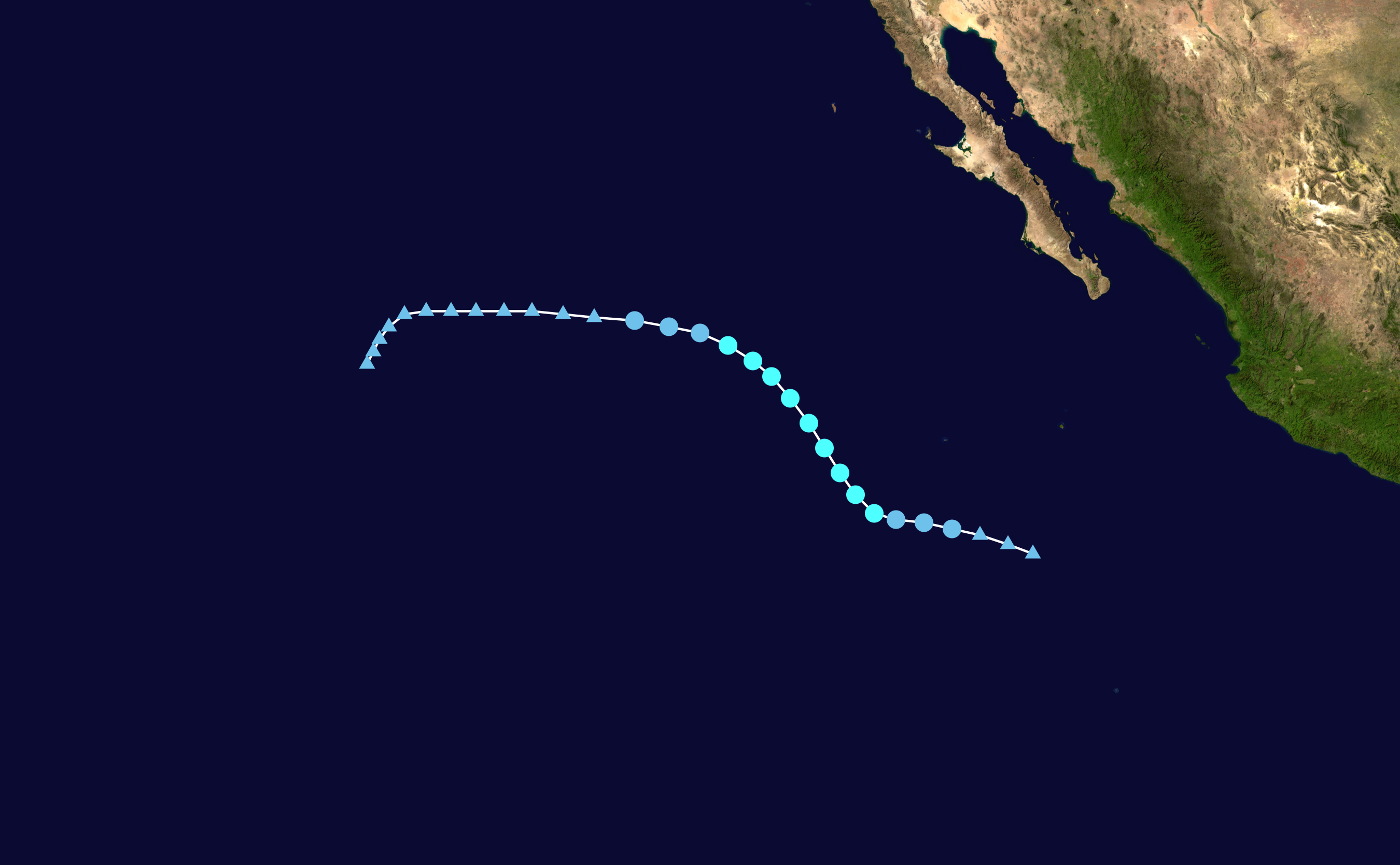
- Duration: September 8 – September 11
- Peak intensity: 45 mph (75 km/h) (1-min); 1002 mbar (hPa)

A tropical wave departed from the western coast of Africa on August 17. It then moved westward across the Atlantic Ocean with minimal convection until it crossed over Central America, entering the Eastern Pacific Ocean. Convection began to increase during the next few days, but this trend was hampered by strong northeasterly wind shear. The system produced sporadic convection until September 8, when thunderstorm activity became continuous. A tropical depression formed around 06:00 UTC on September 8, approximately 680 mi (1,090 km) south-southwest of the southern tip of the Baja California peninsula. The system intensified into Tropical Storm Paul by 00:00 UTC on September 9. The storm traveled westward before turning northwest as it rounded the southwestern edge of a mid-level ridge, which was located over Central Mexico. Paul intensified slightly, peaking at 18:00 UTC with winds of 45 miles per hour (72 km/h) and a pressure of 1,002 mbar (29.59 inHg).

By September 10, Paul began to be affected by an unfavorable environment of dry air, wind shear, and cooling sea surface temperatures. This caused the storm to weaken into a tropical depression by 06:00 UTC on September 11. The depression's convection dispersed later in the day, resulting in the system being downgraded to a remnant low around 00:00 UTC on September 12 while it was about 1,035 mi (1,666 km) west of the southern tip of the Baja California peninsula. A low-level ridge located north of the remnants caused them to return to a westward motion for a couple of days, before a high-pressure system located over the Central Pacific caused them to quickly turn southwestward. The system became elongated and dissipated by 00:00 UTC on September 15.

=== Tropical Depression Nineteen-E ===
- Tropical depression (SSHWS)
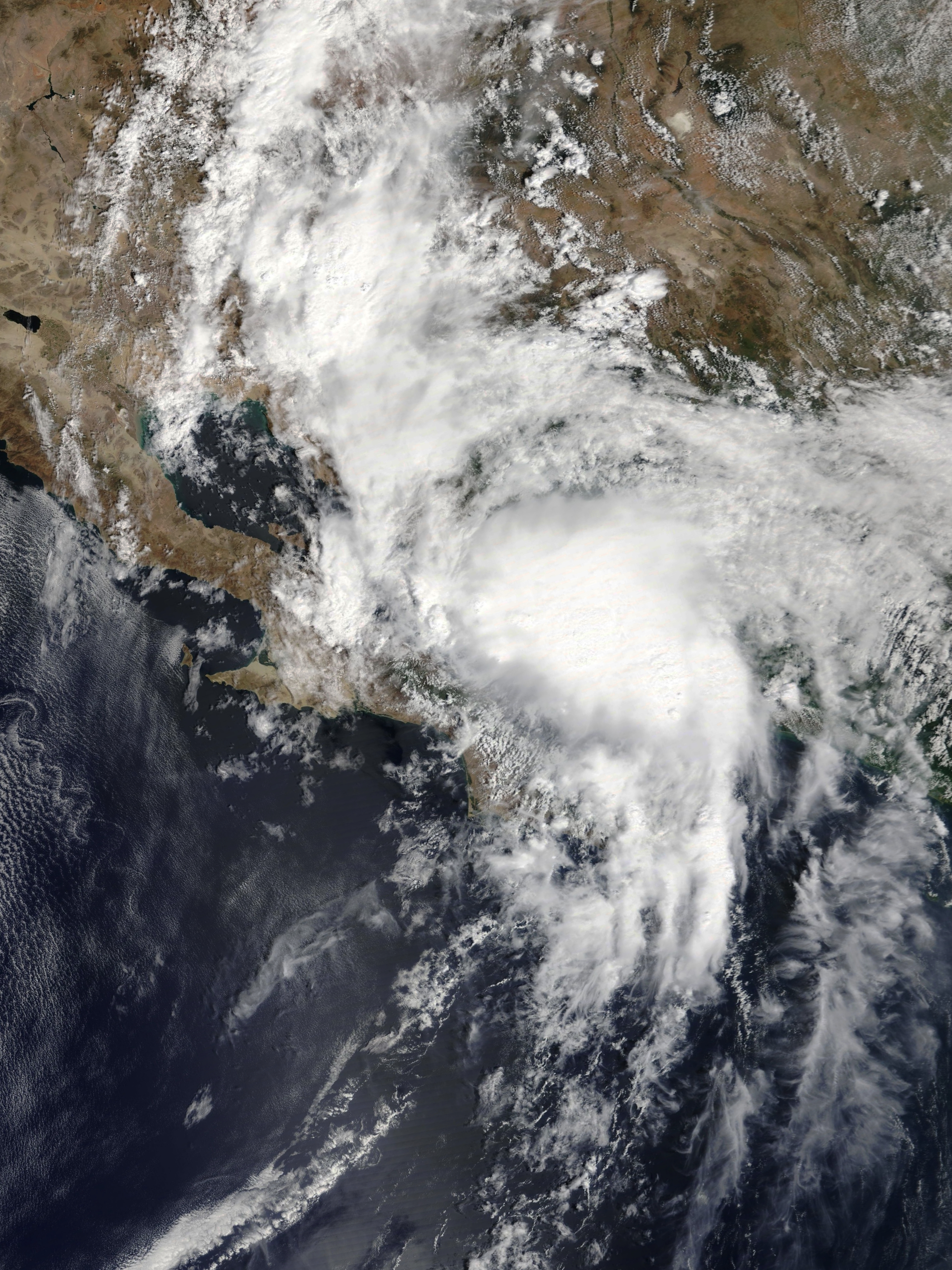
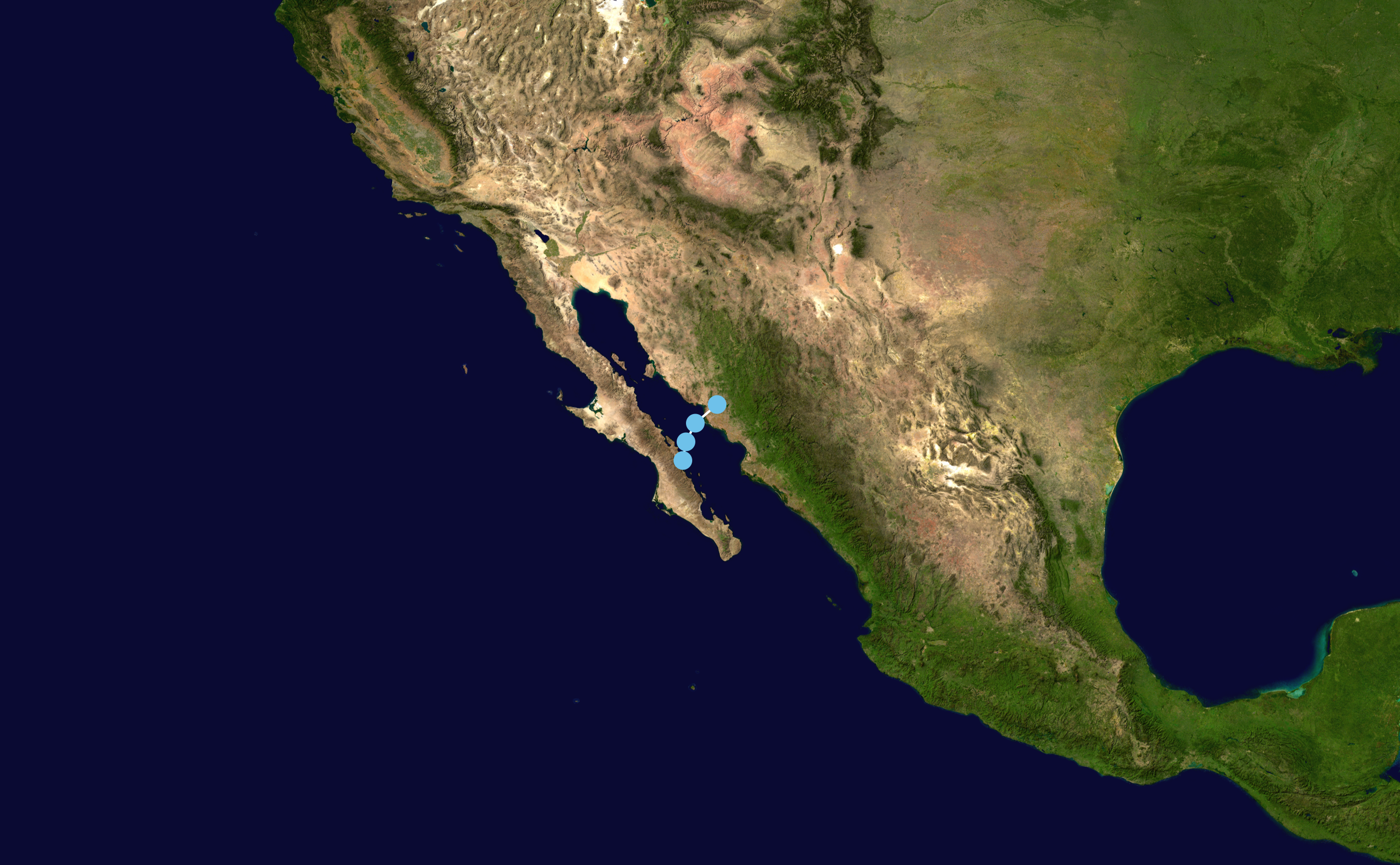
- Duration: September 19 – September 20
- Peak intensity: 35 mph (55 km/h) (1-min); 1002 mbar (hPa)

A tropical wave departed from the western coast of Africa on August 29 and traveled across the tropical Atlantic before reaching the Pacific Ocean around September 6–7. The wave then meandered south of Mexico for around a week. Around the same time, a mid-level trough, which was moving southward, sent moisture into the region. This allowed a surface trough to develop in a north to south orientation over Baja California Sur and the Gulf of California. Initially quite disorganized, thunderstorm activity gathered around a circulation center on September 19, causing a tropical depression to spawn around 12:00 UTC, just off the coast of Loreto, Mexico. This made the system the first tropical cyclone to form in the Gulf of California in recorded history. Tropical Depression Nineteen-E moved mainly northward and reached its peak intensity by 18:00 UTC with winds of 35 miles per hour (56 km/h) and a pressure of 1,002 mbar (29.59 inHg). Wind shear and land interaction inhibited further intensification before the cyclone made landfall between Guaymas and Ciudad Obregón on the Sonoran coast, around 03:00 UTC on September 20. The depression dissipated by 06:00 UTC, about 60 mi (95 km) inland.

Tropical Depression Nineteen-E brought torrential rainfall to western Mexico, with a peak total of 15.06 in (382.5 mm) occurring in Ahome, Sinaloa. In Nogales, Sonora, over 300 metric tons (330.7 US tons) of debris had to be cleared from roadways. Floodwaters killed and swept away the bodies of two people in the state. The depression directly killed five people and indirectly killed two in Sinaloa state. Over 300,000 structures were inundated in state, leaving behind US$165.8 million (MX$3.182 billion) in flood damage. The storm caused an additional US$41 million (MX$800 million) in damage after destroying 35,000 acres (14,000 hectares) of crops and associated equipment. Nineteen-E also left over 500,000 livestock dead in the state. The cyclone killed another three people in Chihuahua state. The remnants of Nineteen-E drew moisture from the Gulf of Mexico and entered the U.S. states of Arizona, Texas, Oklahoma, and Arkansas, causing US$250 million in damage. The highest rainfall in the United States, 15.81 in (401.6 mm), occurred in Johnston County, Oklahoma. One person was killed by flooding in the state of Texas. Fonden announced that it would provide US$1.5 million (MX$33 million) for the reconstruction of Culican, Sinaloa, in 2019. Two children died due to an unrepaired storm sewer, which had been damaged during the storm, before the damage was fixed in September 2019.

=== Hurricane Rosa ===
- Category 4 hurricane (SSHWS)
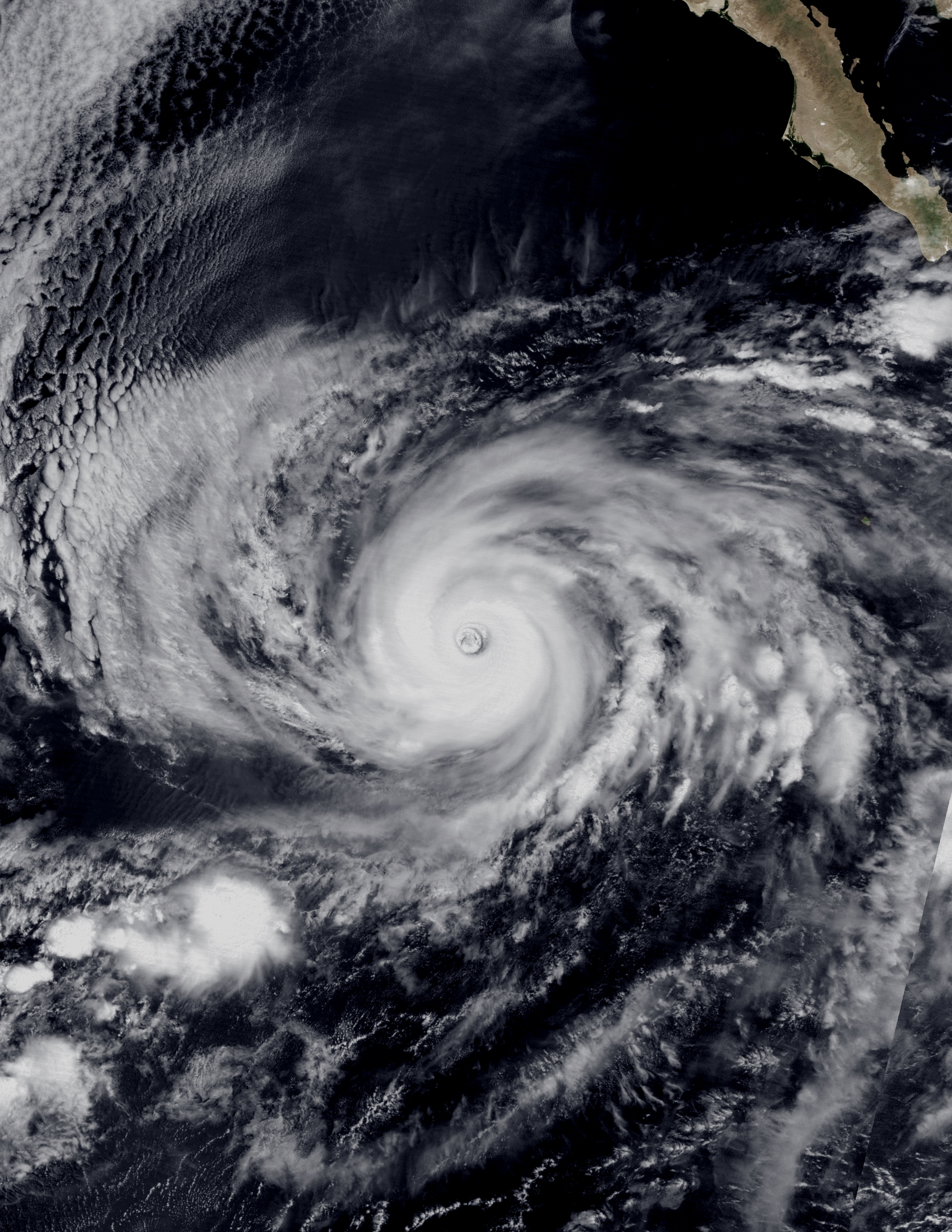
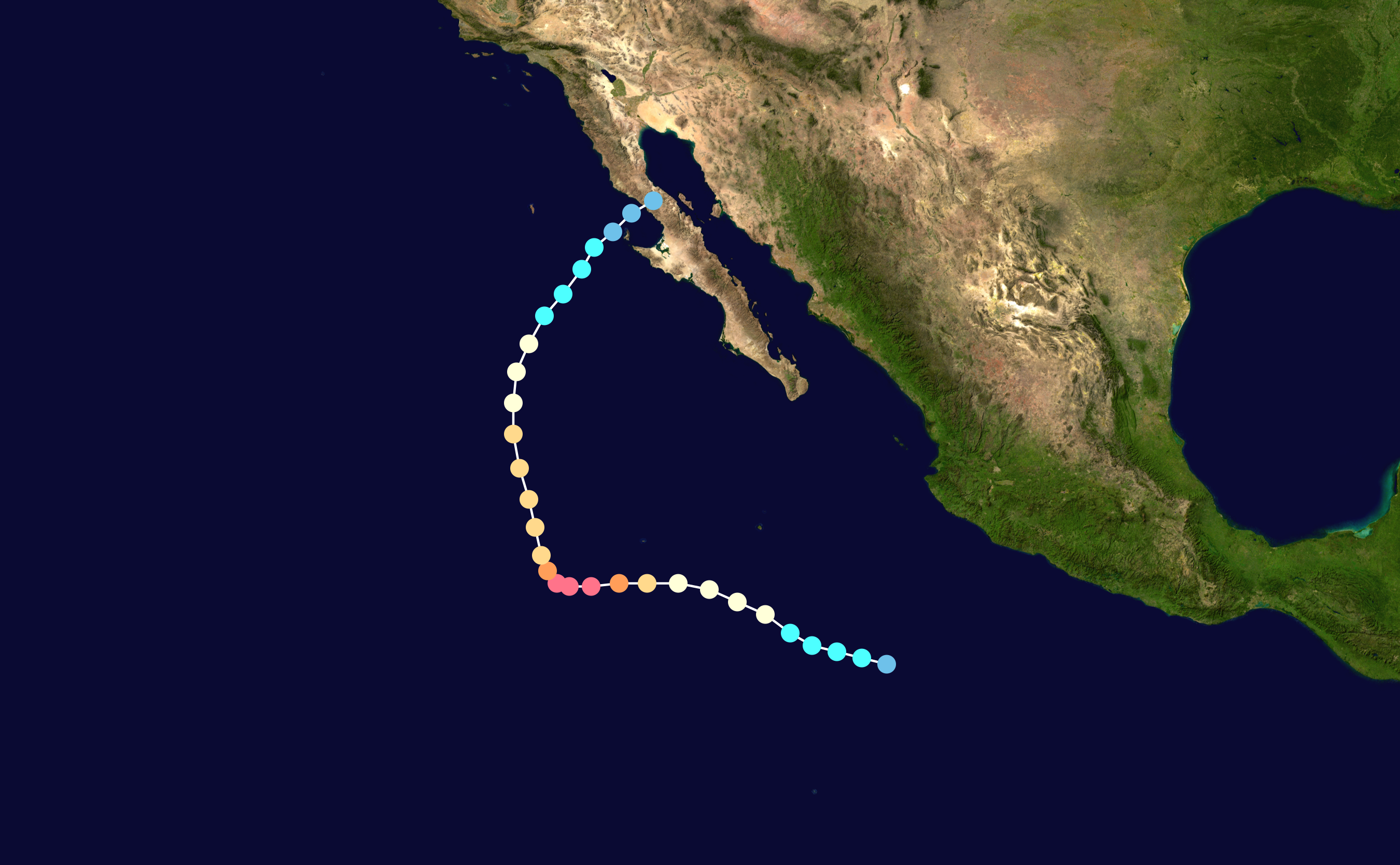
- Duration: September 25 – October 2
- Peak intensity: 150 mph (240 km/h) (1-min); 936 mbar (hPa)

A robust tropical wave departed from the western coast of Africa on September 6 and was located south of the Gulf of Tehuantepec by September 22. Upon arrival, thunderstorm activity increased significantly and the system developed a center of circulation. A tropical depression spawned at 06:00 UTC on September 25, around 405 mi (650 km) south-southwest of Manzanillo, Mexico. Despite being affected by northeasterly shear, the depression developed banding features. This increase in organization led to the depression becoming Tropical Storm Rosa around 12:00 UTC on the same day. While tracking northwest, Rosa began to develop a low-level eye feature. A period of rapid intensification ensued with Rosa becoming a hurricane at 12:00 UTC on September 26. This trend continued as Rosa turned more westward. Rosa peaked as a Category 4 hurricane on September 28 at 06:00 UTC with winds 150 miles per hour (240 km/h) and a pressure of 936 mbar (27.64 inHg). An eyewall replacement cycle began shortly after, causing a period of weakening to commence. As Rosa turned northwestward, a worsening environment aloft caused the weakening trend to continue. The cyclone was tracking northeastward by September 30 and rapidly weakened. Rosa made landfall around 11:00 UTC on October 2 as a 35 miles per hour (56 km/h) tropical depression, about 70 mi (115 km) southeast of Punta San Antonio on the Baja California Peninsula. Rosa interacted with mountainous terrain after landfall and dissipated by 18:00 UTC.

Rosa warranted the issuance of tropical storm watches and warnings along the western and eastern coasts of the Baja California Peninsula. Rainfall from Rosa was heaviest in Baja California, with a peak total of 6.54 in (166 mm) occurring in Percebu. Flooding caused road damage and sinkholes in San Felipe, Baja California; the town's port lost US$530,000 (MX$10 million) after having been closed. In Sonora, thunderstorms caused power outages and flooding; the flooding swept away vehicles, left roadways impassable, damaged dozens of homes and businesses, and killed one woman. In the United States, Rosa's remnants caused torrential rainfall and flooding in the Four Corners region; 6.89 in (175 mm) of rain was reported at Towers Mountain, Arizona. In addition to flooding, Rosa's remnants caused power outages, several dozen accidents near Phoenix, and two traffic-related deaths outside Phoenix. A community near Sells, Arizona had to be evacuated on October 2 after an earthen dam neared maximum capacity; the dam did not breach and residents were allowed to return two weeks later. Damage caused by Rosa's remnants totaled about US$50 million in the Southwestern United States.

=== Hurricane Sergio ===
- Category 4 hurricane (SSHWS)
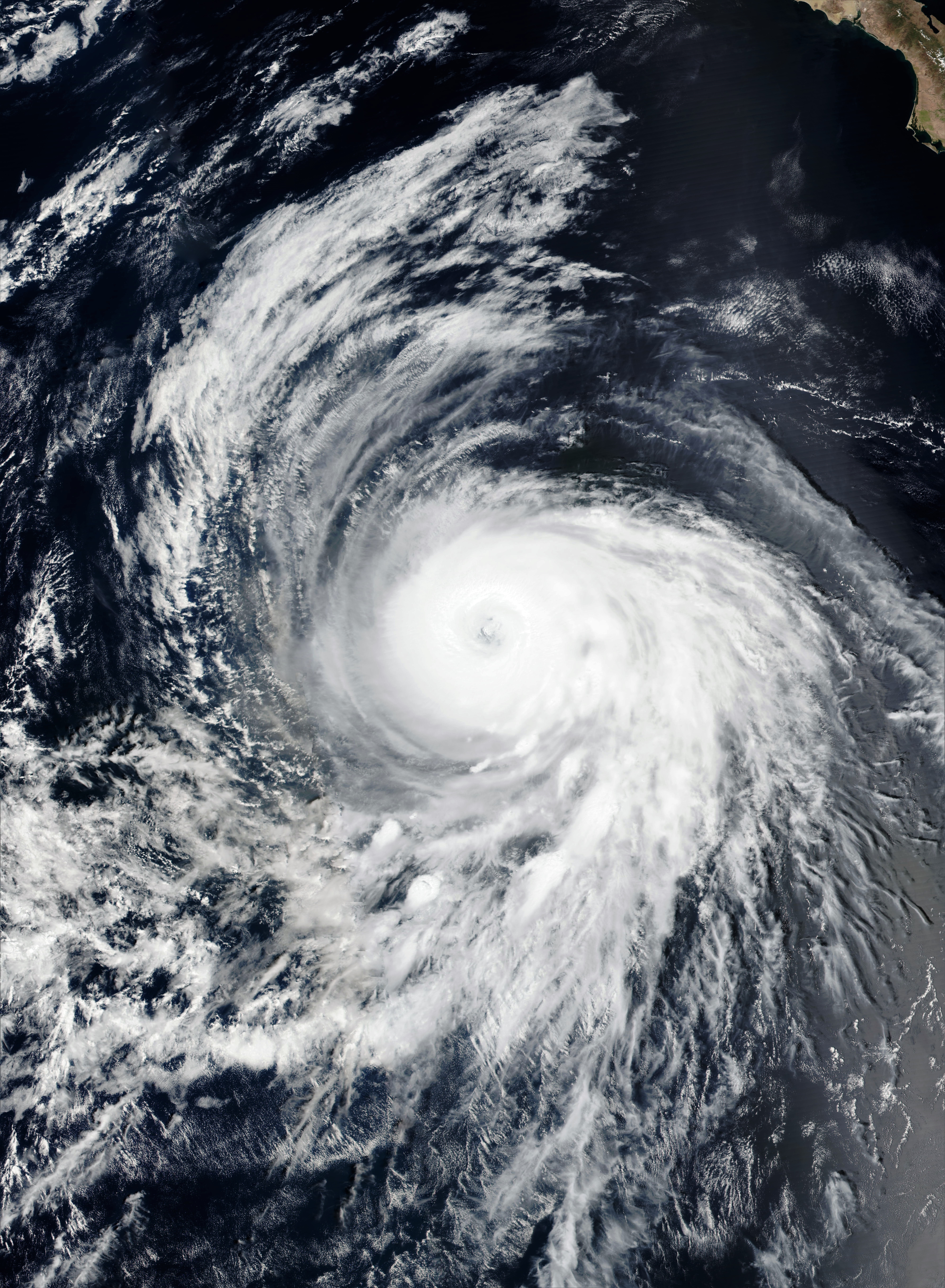
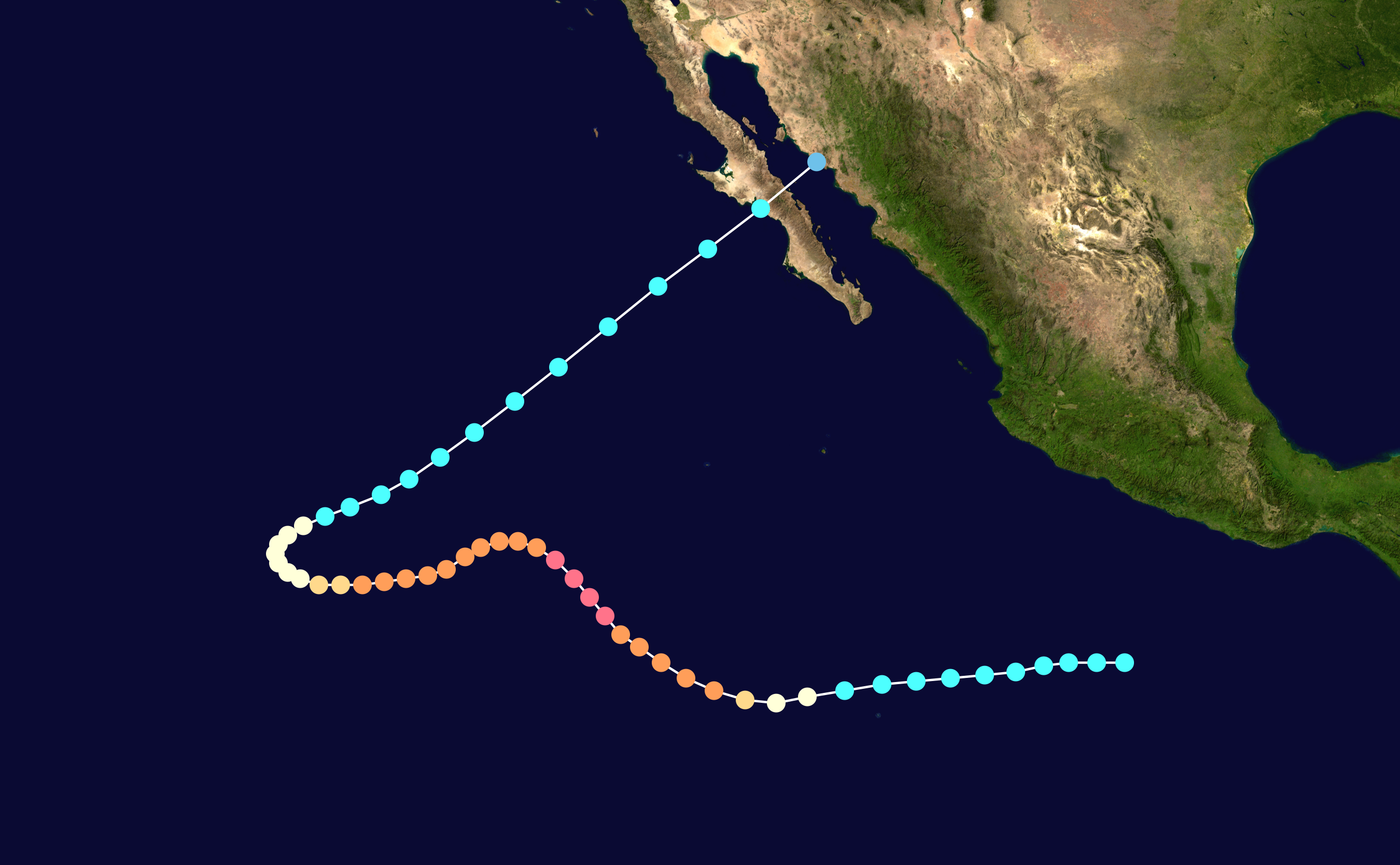
- Duration: September 29 – October 13
- Peak intensity: 140 mph (220 km/h) (1-min); 942 mbar (hPa)

A disturbance located over South America on September 24 crossed over Central America during the next couple of days. Convection associated with the system increased, however, the system remained quite disorganized. Continual convection occurred by September 28 as the system began producing gale-force winds. A low-level center developed on September 29 and became better defined. Tropical Storm Sergio formed by 12:00 UTC on that day, around 385 mi (620 km) south of Zihuatanejo, Mexico. During its first few days, Sergio tracked westward and later towards the west-southwest. It only slowly strengthened as a result of its large size and dry air entanglement. The cyclone became a hurricane at about 00:00 UTC on October 2 after its eyewall fully closed. The storm then rapidly intensified over the next day. An eyewall replacement cycle that took place during October 3 caused the intensification to temporarily cease; Sergio began to intensify again by 18:00 UTC. Sergio peaked around 06:00 UTC on October 4 as a Category 4 hurricane with winds of 140 miles per hour (230 km/h) and a pressure of 942 mbar (27.82 inHg), while located 825 mi (1,328 km) southwest of Cabo San Lucas, Mexico.

A second eyewall replacement cycle caused the cyclone to weaken into a Category 3 on October 5 before it reintensified later in the day. Sergio traveled towards the west and west-southwest throughout this period. The cyclone went through a third eyewall replacement cycle on October 8 as it tracked northeastward. Sergio acquired annular characteristics as it weakened slightly during the next couple of days. The storm then quickly weakened as it was propelled towards the Baja California Peninsula. Sergio made landfall near Los Castros, Baja California Sur around 12:00 UTC on October 12 with 50 miles per hour (80 km/h) winds. The tropical storm then emerged into and traversed the Gulf of California before making a second landfall as a tropical depression around 18:00 UTC, about 25 mi (40 km) west-northwest of Guaymas, Sonora. Sergio dissipated over mountainous terrain a few hours later.

Sergio necessitated the issuance of tropical storm watches and warnings for the Baja California Peninsula. Gale-force winds damaged infrastructure in Guaymas, Sonora, causing US$2.08 million (MX$40 million) in damage. Rainfall from the storm peaked at 5.05 in (128 mm) in Punta de Aqua II. Houses were inundated by floodwaters in the states of Sonoroa and Chihuahua, leaving behind damage. Moisture from Sergio's remnants led to the development of thunderstorms over Texas around October 12–13. Ten tornadoes spawned across the state as a result, collectively inflicting about US$445,000 in damage. Strong winds and hail from the thunderstorms caused another US$30,000 in damage. Sergio's remnants also caused flash flooding in the state of Arizona, dealing US$73,000 in damage.

=== Hurricane Walaka ===
- Category 5 hurricane (SSHWS)
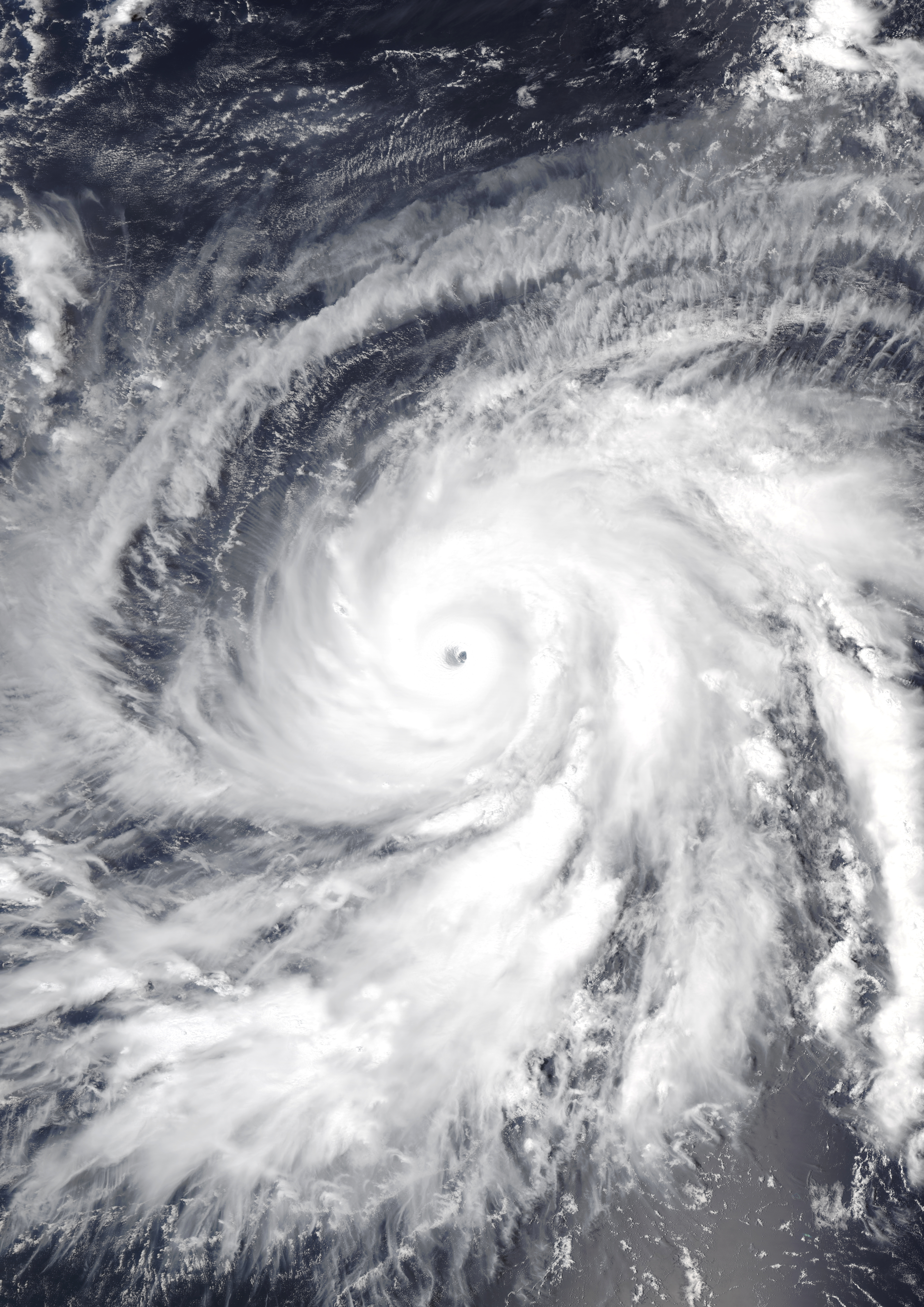
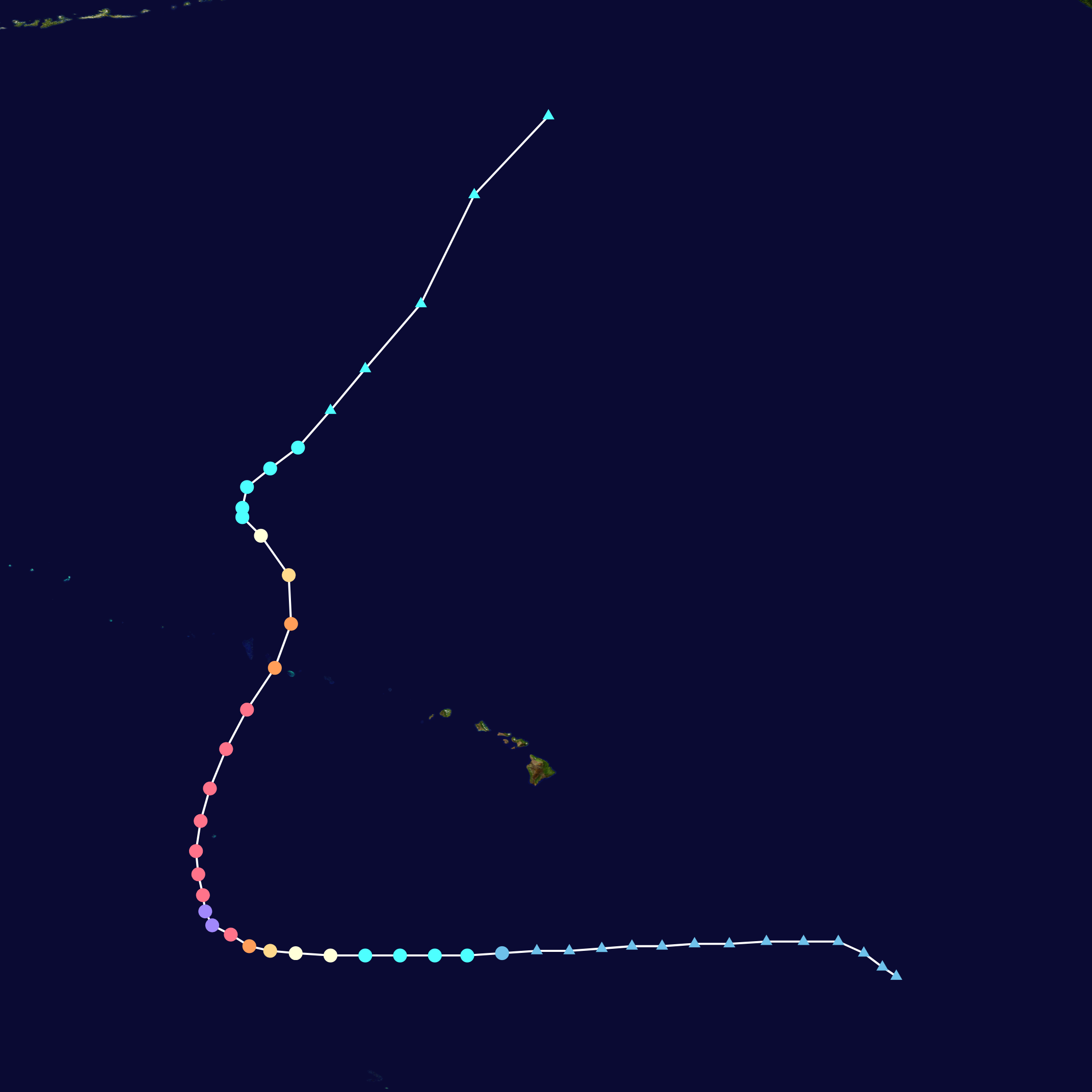
- Duration: September 29 – October 6
- Peak intensity: 160 mph (260 km/h) (1-min); 921 mbar (hPa)

A weak surface trough entered the Central Pacific Ocean on September 26 and continued westward for the next couple of days. The system began to organize on September 29 as continual convection and banding features developed near its center. A tropical depression formed around 12:00 UTC and strengthened into Tropical Storm Walaka six hours later, while located around 690 mi (1,110 km) south of Honolulu, Hawaii. A favorable environment below the storm and aloft allowed Walaka to rapidly intensify into a hurricane by 18:00 UTC on September 30. The cyclone's eye and the surrounding clouds became well established late on October 1. Walaka peaked as a Category 5 hurricane at 00:00 UTC on October 2 with winds of 160 miles per hour (260 km/h) and a pressure of 921 mbar (27.20 inHg). This intensity made Walaka the fourth major hurricane in the Central Pacific and second Category 5 hurricane of the season.

After peaking, Walaka began to undergo an eyewall replacement cycle. The cyclone weakened into a minimal Category 4 hurricane by 00:00 UTC on October 3 before briefly reintensifying later in the day. Increasing wind shear and lower sea surface temperatures caused Walaka to quickly weaken over the next couple of days, with the system falling to tropical storm strength by 06:00 UTC on October 5. Walaka transitioned into an extratropical system by 12:00 UTC on October 6 as it traveled north-northeastward. The extratropical system continued in that direction and dissipated by 18:00 UTC on October 7.

Tropical cyclone watches and warnings were issued for Johnston Atoll and the Northwestern Hawaiian Islands as a result of the threat Walaka posed. The cyclone made landfall 35 mi (55 km) west-northwest of French Frigate Shoals as a high-end Category 3 hurricane around 06:20 UTC on October 4. Walaka's only impact to land was that its storm surge completely destroyed East Island, wiping out the nesting grounds for the endangered green sea turtle and critically endangered Hawaiian monk seal.

=== Tropical Storm Tara ===
- Tropical storm (SSHWS)
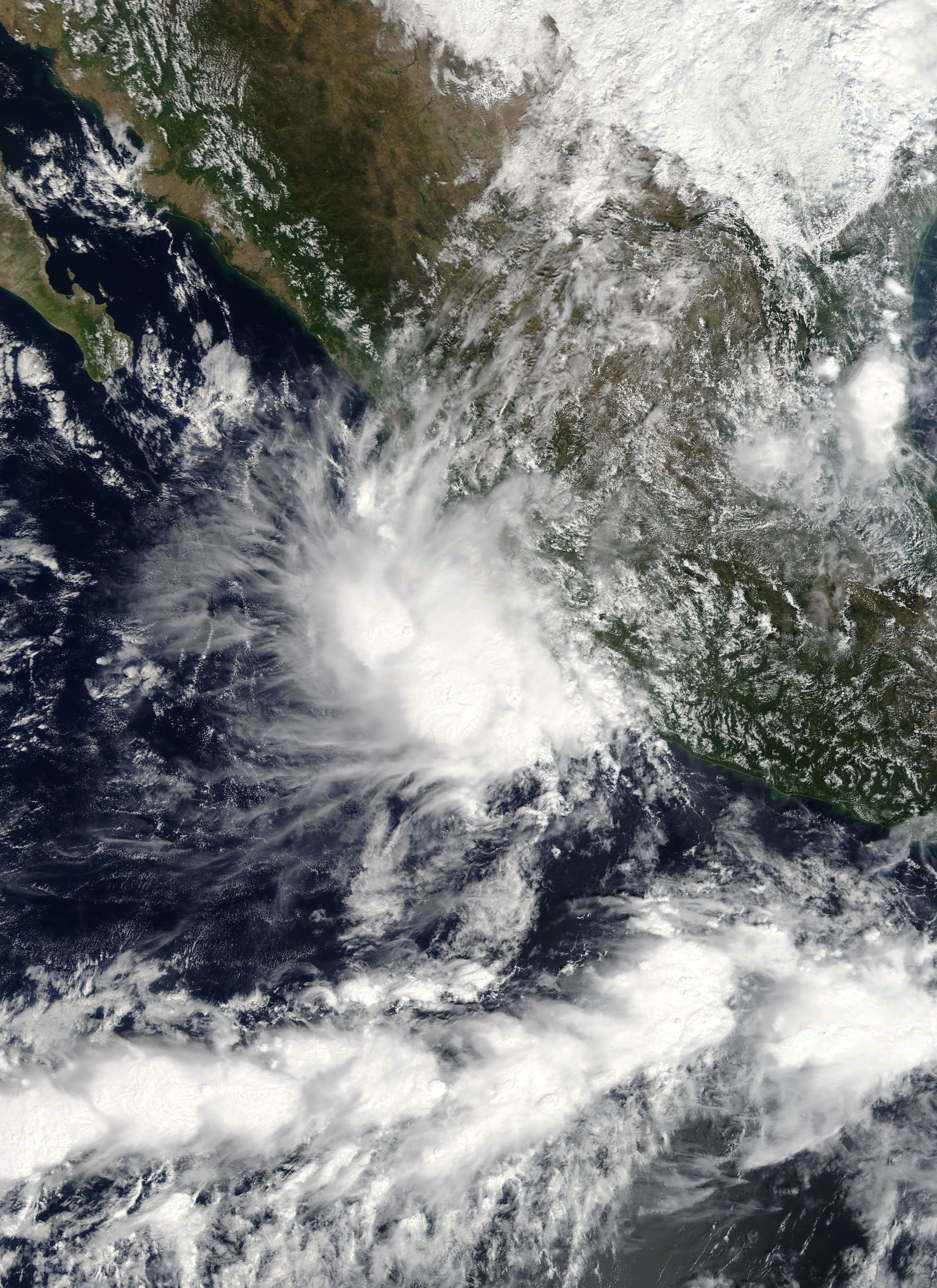
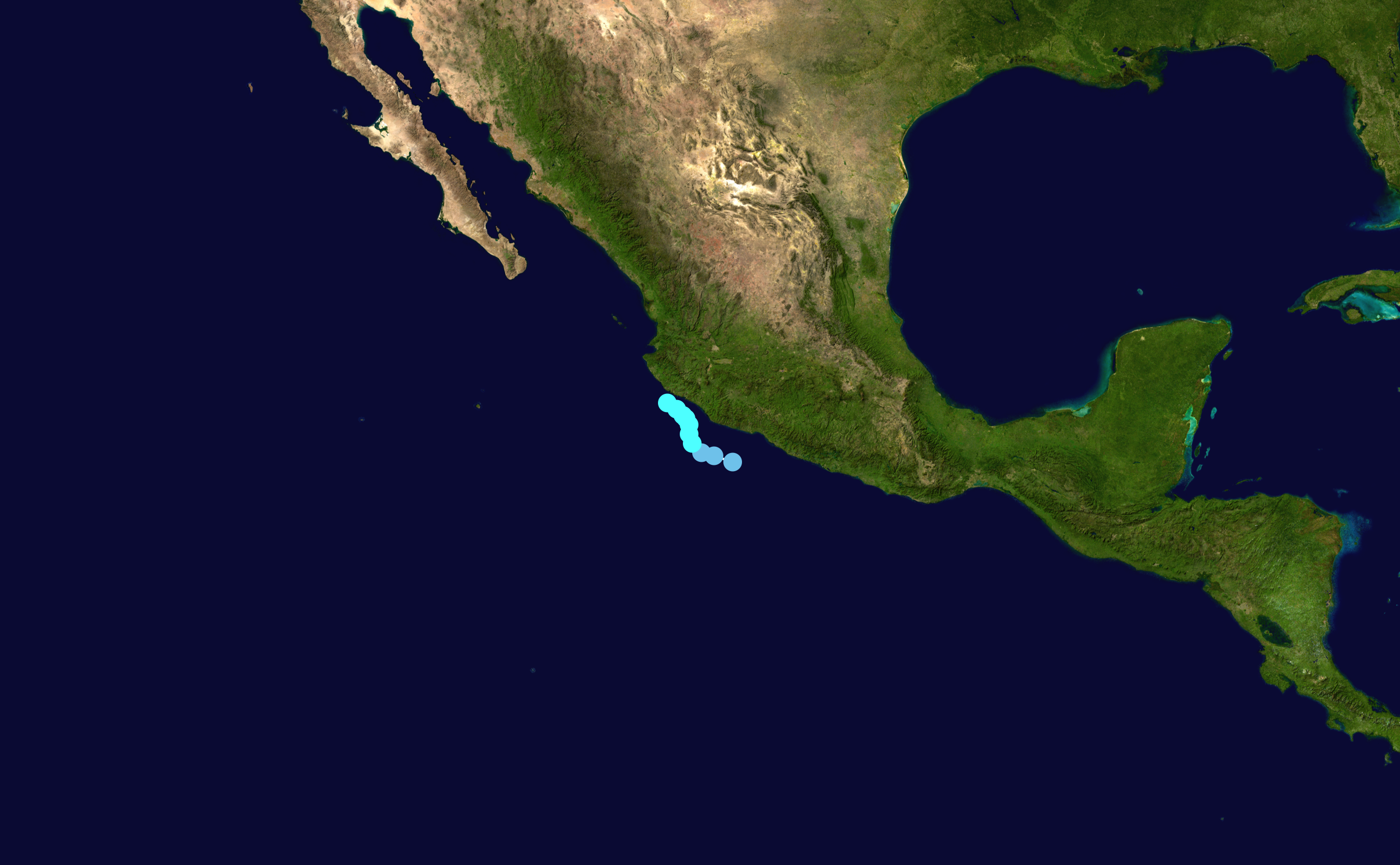
- Duration: October 14 – October 17
- Peak intensity: 65 mph (100 km/h) (1-min); 995 mbar (hPa)

A low-level gyre located over Central America, which was also associated with the formation of Hurricane Michael in the Caribbean Sea, contributed to the genesis of Tropical Storm Tara. During the period of October 7–10, the disturbance moved into the Gulf of Tehuantepec, after which convection increased. The system then traveled west-northwest over the next several days, parallel to the western coast of Mexico. The system's convection then increased in organization, resulting in the genesis of a tropical depression at approximately 12:00 UTC on October 14, around 185 mi (300 km) southeast of Manzanillo, Mexico. The nascent depression turned from the west-northwest to the north-northwest as it tracked through a weakness in a trough located over northern Baja California and a mid-level high located over the Gulf of Mexico.

Despite the presence of easterly wind shear, the system became a tropical storm around 06:00 UTC on October 15, while located about 110 mi (175 km) south-southeast of Manzanillo, Mexico. The cyclone continued to intensify and peaked at 00:00 UTC on October 16 with winds of 65 miles per hour (105 km/h) and a pressure of 995 mbar (29.38 inHg). Steering currents around Tara significantly weakened, almost halting the cyclone's forward motion. A combination of land interaction and increasing southeasterly wind shear caused weakening to commence. Tara opened into a trough just west of Manzanillo around 00:00 on October 17 and dissipated soon after.

=== Tropical Storm Vicente ===
- Tropical storm (SSHWS)
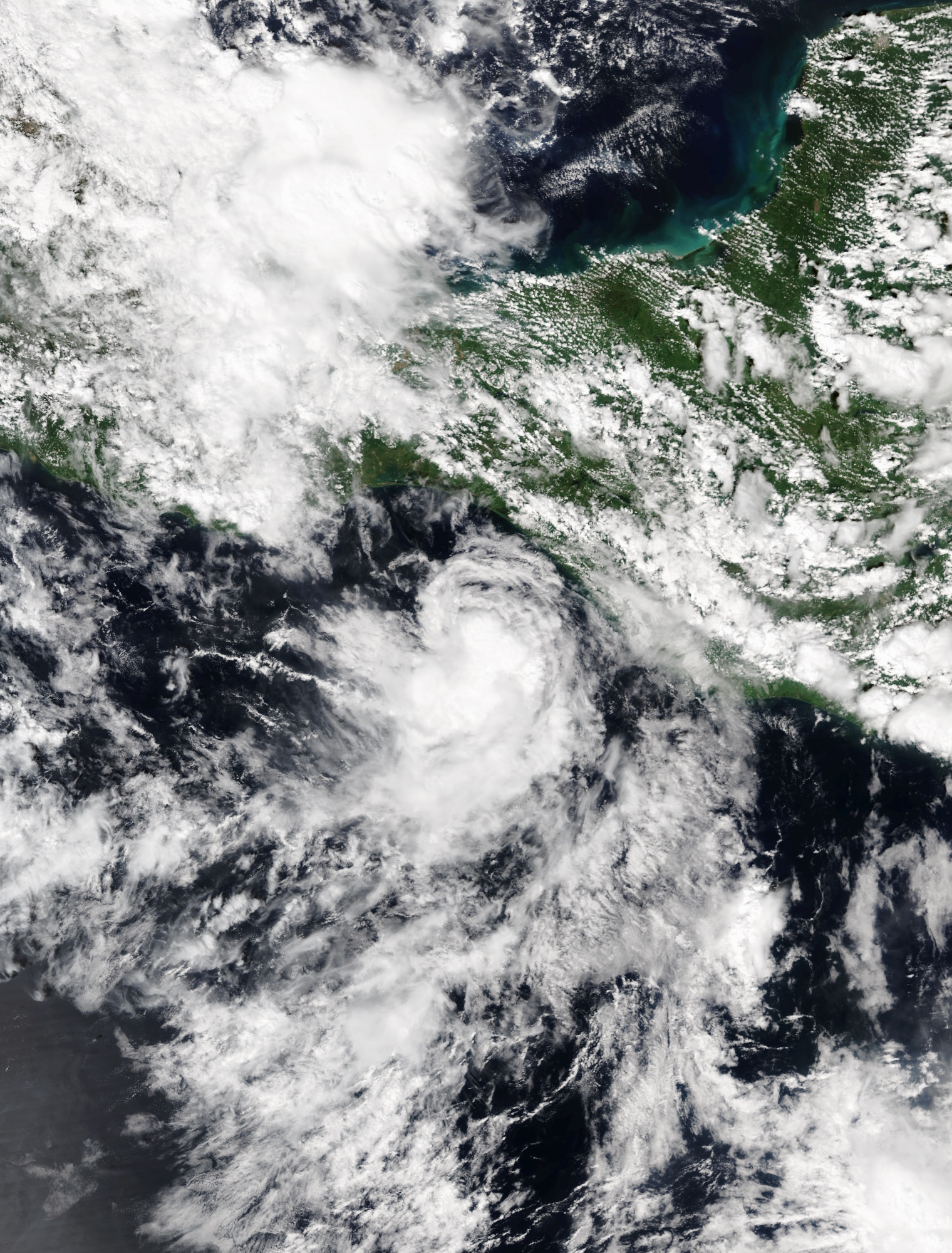
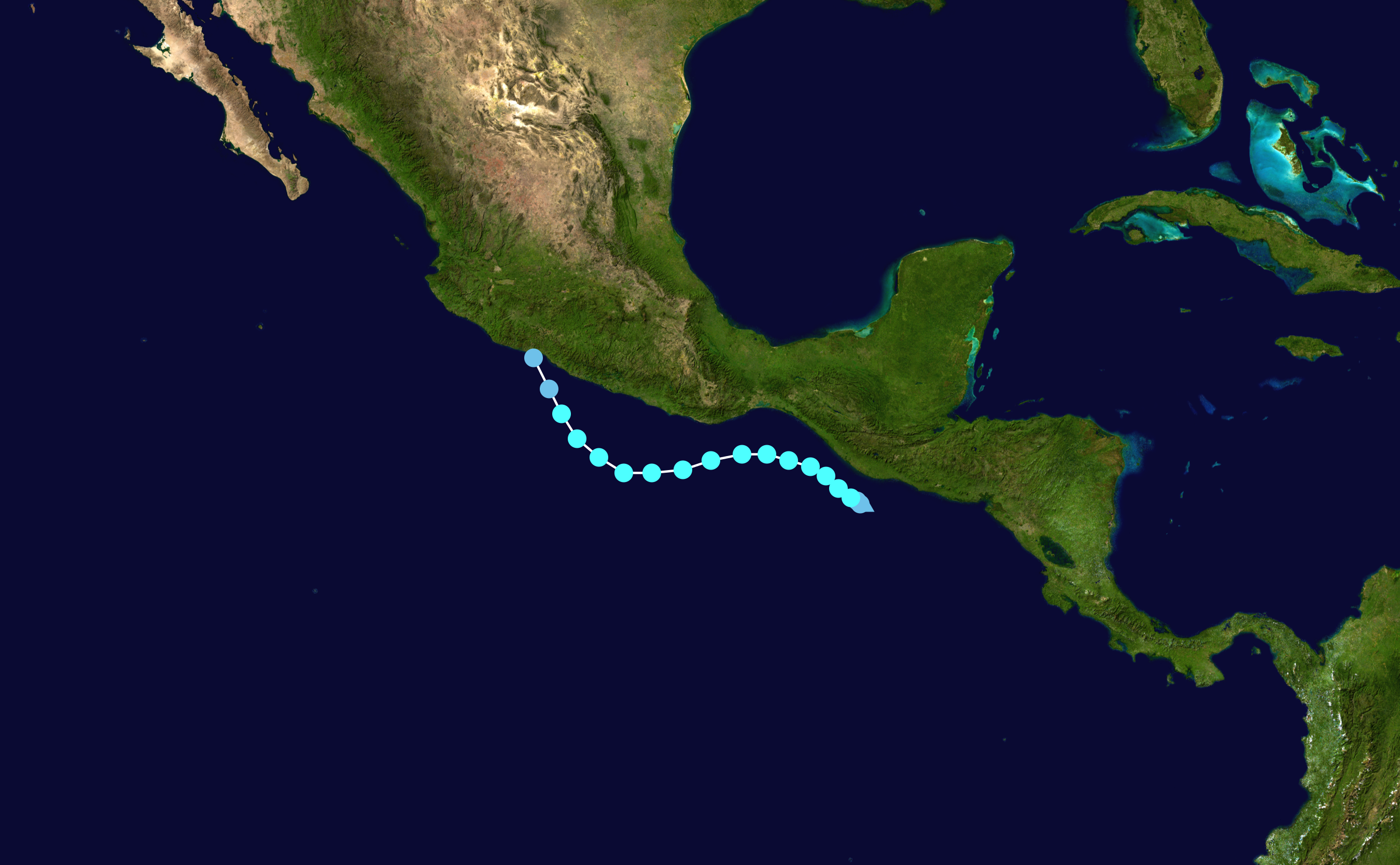
- Duration: October 19 – October 23
- Peak intensity: 50 mph (85 km/h) (1-min); 1002 mbar (hPa)

A tropical wave departed from the western coast of Africa on October 6 and traveled westward, arriving at Central America on October 16. Soon after, convection formed along the monsoon trough near the wave. Convection increased and gradually organized over the next few days. A tropical depression formed on October 19 around 06:00 UTC, around 90 mi (145 km) west-southwest of Puerto San José, Guatemala. Located within a favorable environment, the nascent depression quickly became better organized, developing banding features around its center. This led to the development of Tropical Storm Vicente by 18:00 UTC on the same day. During the course of the day, the cyclone tracked northwestward at around 6 mph (9.7 km/h), while it was also very close to the Guatemalan shore. Vicente began traveling west-northwest on October 20, just off the coast of southeastern Mexico. Vicente peaked at 18:00 UTC with winds of 50 miles per hour (80 km/h) and a pressure of 1,002 mbar (29.59 inHg), while less than 115 mi (185 km) off the Mexican coast.

During the overnight, Vicente began tracking westward. Dry air intrusion caused the tropical storm to weaken on October 21 as it traveled south of west. The dry air abated on October 22, allowing for some re-intensification. Outflow from Hurricane Willa, which was located to the northwest, produced northerly wind shear, which caused Vicente to weaken to a tropical depression by 06:00 UTC on October 23. Vicente made landfall near Playa Azul in Michoacán around 13:30 UTC and dissipated by 18:00 UTC after interacting with land.

Vicente brought torrential rainfall to southern Mexico, peaking at over 12 in (300 mm) in the state of Oaxaca. Twenty-seven neighborhoods were flooded in Morelia, Michoacán; hundreds of homes were inundated throughout several neighborhoods after flooding 3.3 ft (1 m) deep occurred. Heavy rainfall caused flooding and landslides in Oaxaca, leaving 13 people dead. Roadways in the state suffered severe damage after dozens of landslides occurred. Flood waters swept away cars, created a sinkhole, and inundated dozens of homes and businesses. Flooding in the state of Veracruz left another three people dead. Nearly two dozen landslides occurred in the state, damaging over three dozen roads and schools. The overflow of the Coatzacoalcos River flooded several hundred houses. Aon estimated that damages to be greater than US$1 million.

=== Hurricane Willa ===
- Category 5 hurricane (SSHWS)
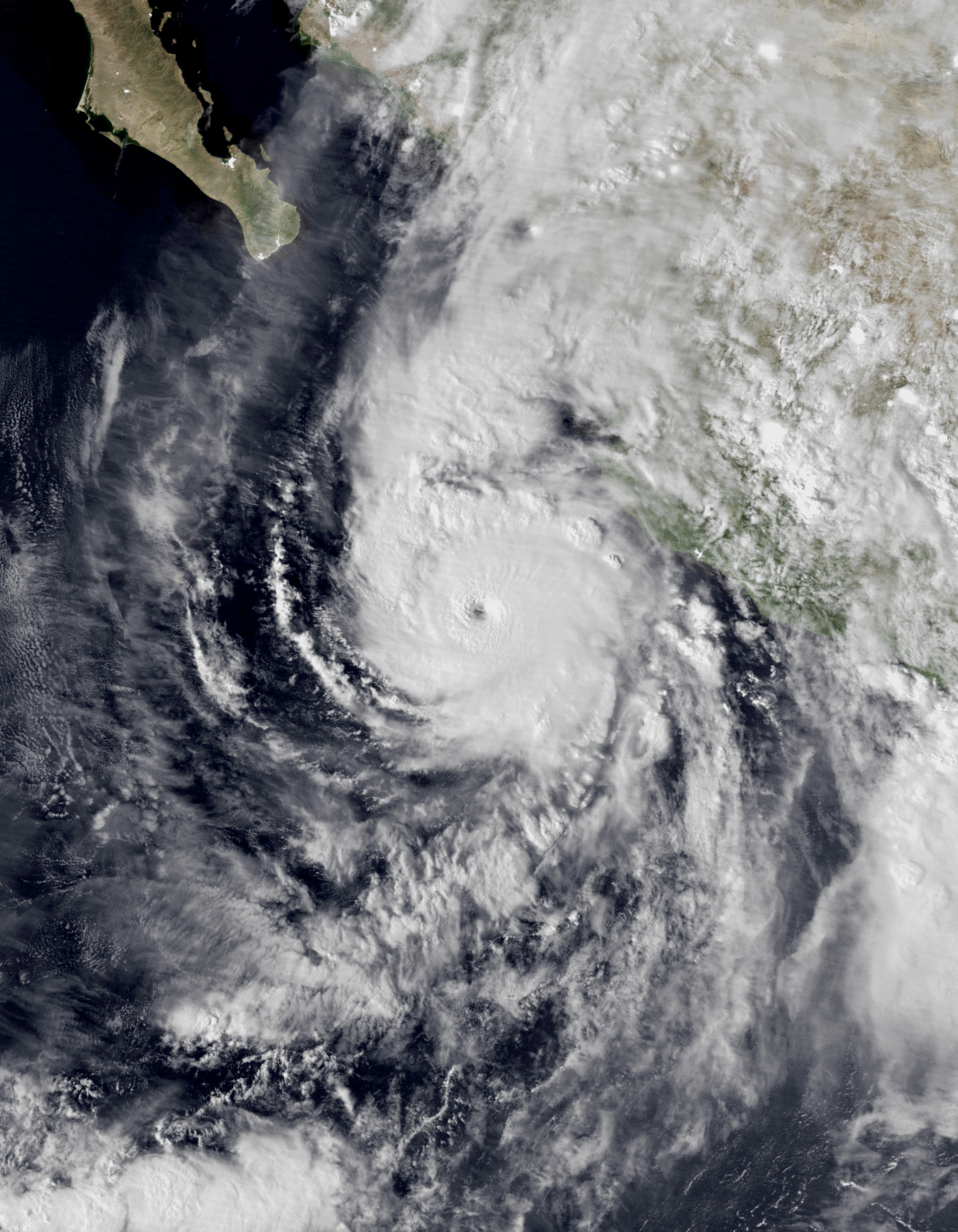
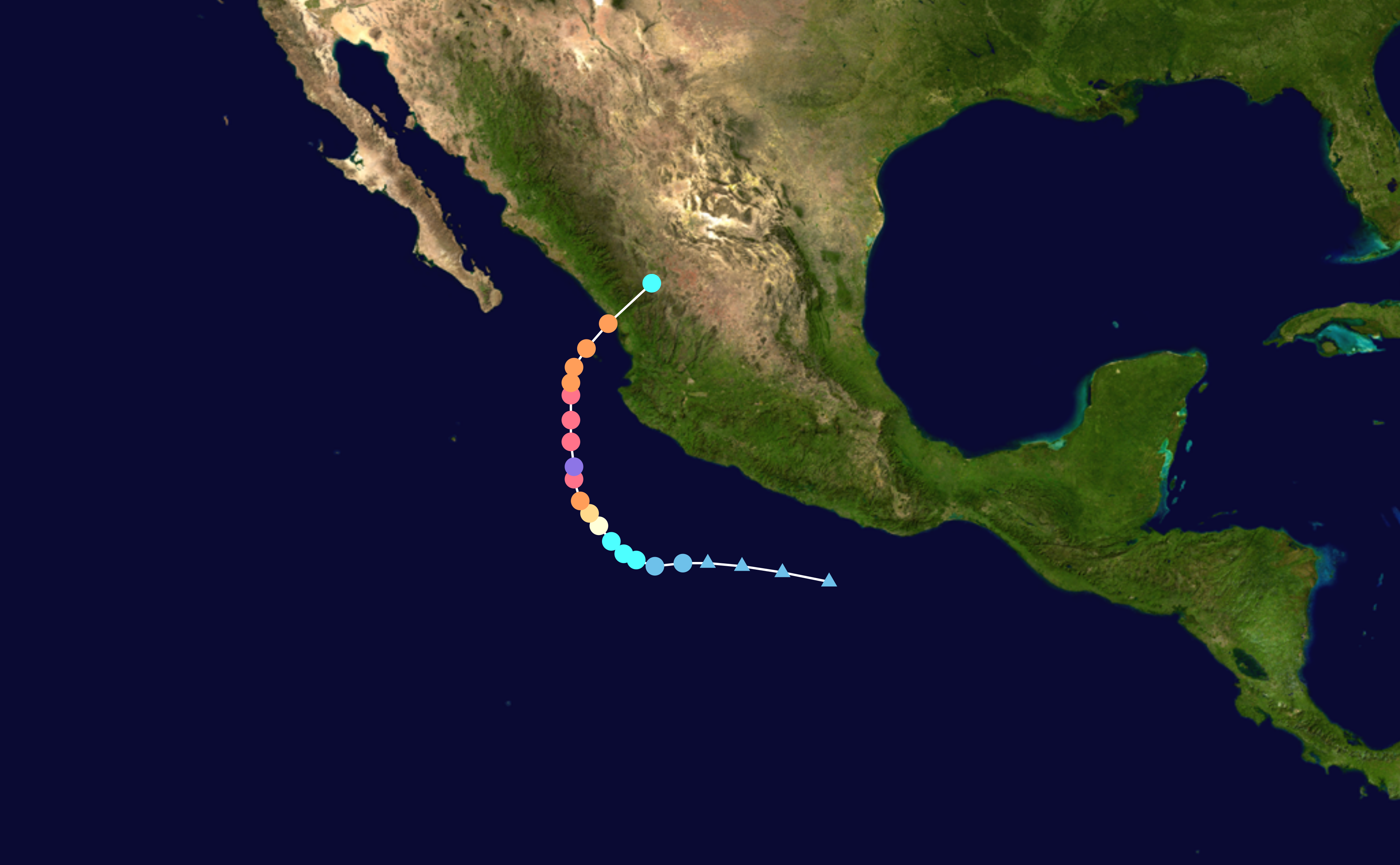
- Duration: October 20 – October 24
- Peak intensity: 160 mph (260 km/h) (1-min); 925 mbar (hPa)

A tropical depression formed from a tropical wave on October 20, approximately 265 mi (425 km) south of Manzanillo, Mexico. Moving northwest, it quickly strengthened into Tropical Storm Willa. A favorable environment along with Willa's smaller size allowed the cyclone to rapidly intensify for nearly two days. Willa reached hurricane intensity by 06:00 UTC on October 21 and became a major hurricane around 18:00 UTC. Willa peaked as a Category 5 hurricane on October 22 at 06:00 UTC with winds of 160 miles per hour (260 km/h) and a pressure of 925 mbar (27.32 inHg), while located 195 mi (315 km) south-southwest of Cabo Corrientes, Mexico. After peaking, a combination of cooling sea surface temperatures and an eyewall replacement cycle caused Willa to weaken. Around 01:20 UTC on October 24, Willa made landfall near Palmito del Verde, Sinaloa with winds of 115 miles per hour (185 km/h). It rapidly weakened over land, dissipating over Mexico, while its remnant moisture spread into Texas and Louisiana.

Hurricane Willa necessitated the issuance of tropical cyclone watches and warnings along the southwestern coast of Mexico. As a precautionary measure, over 200,000 people were evacuated from coastal regions in advance of the storm. Willa brought winds up to 115 miles per hour (185 km/h) to the region where it made landfall and torrential rainfall to multiple states; rainfall peaked at 15.39 in (391 mm) in San Andrés Milpillas, Nayarit. Willa wrought catastrophic damage throughout the region where it made landfall, with damage totaling US$825 million (MX$17.2 billion). The town of Los Sandovales in Acaponeta Municipality, Nayarit, was completely destroyed by Willa. The cyclone left a total of 9 people dead throughout four Mexican states. The storm isolated multiple communities in Sinaloa and Nayarit; the San Pedro and Acaponeta rivers flooded, leaving 180,000 people without food and outside communication for at least one week after the storm. Multiple cities in the states of Sinaloa and Nayarit were left without any potable water, and in some cases, this remained the case for several months after the storm. Around 100,000 people were left homeless in Nayarit. In Sinaloa, 2,000 families were living under plastic roofs half a year after the storm. Reconstruction in Sinaloa did not occur in the months after the storm; a state official stated it could take years to receive federal funding. Reconstruction efforts in Nayarit were hampered by the state government's bankruptcy. The Mexican federal government allocated US$94 million (MX$2.25 billion) towards Nayarit reconstruction, with work slated to begin in February 2019.

=== Tropical Storm Xavier ===
- Tropical storm (SSHWS)
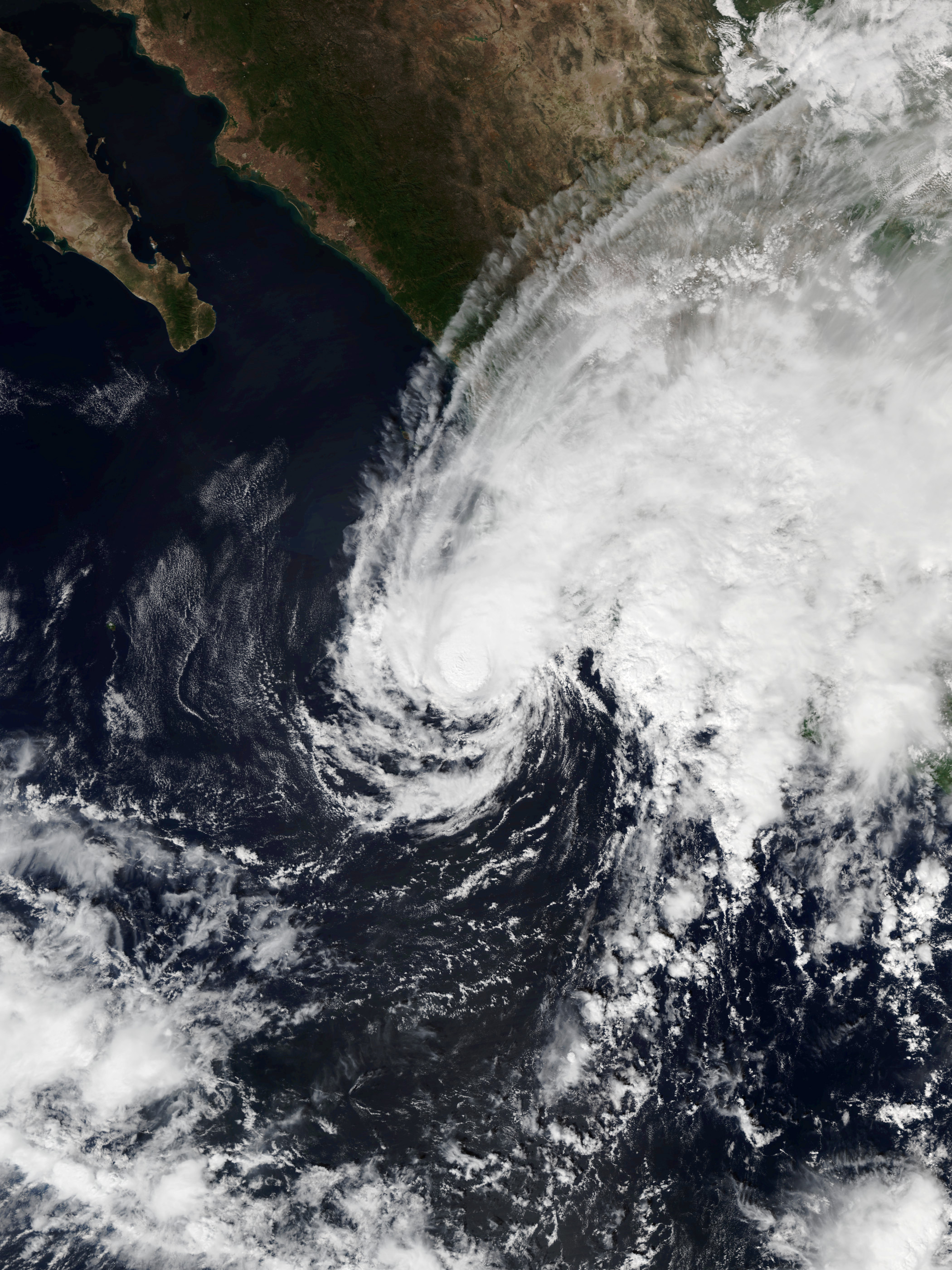
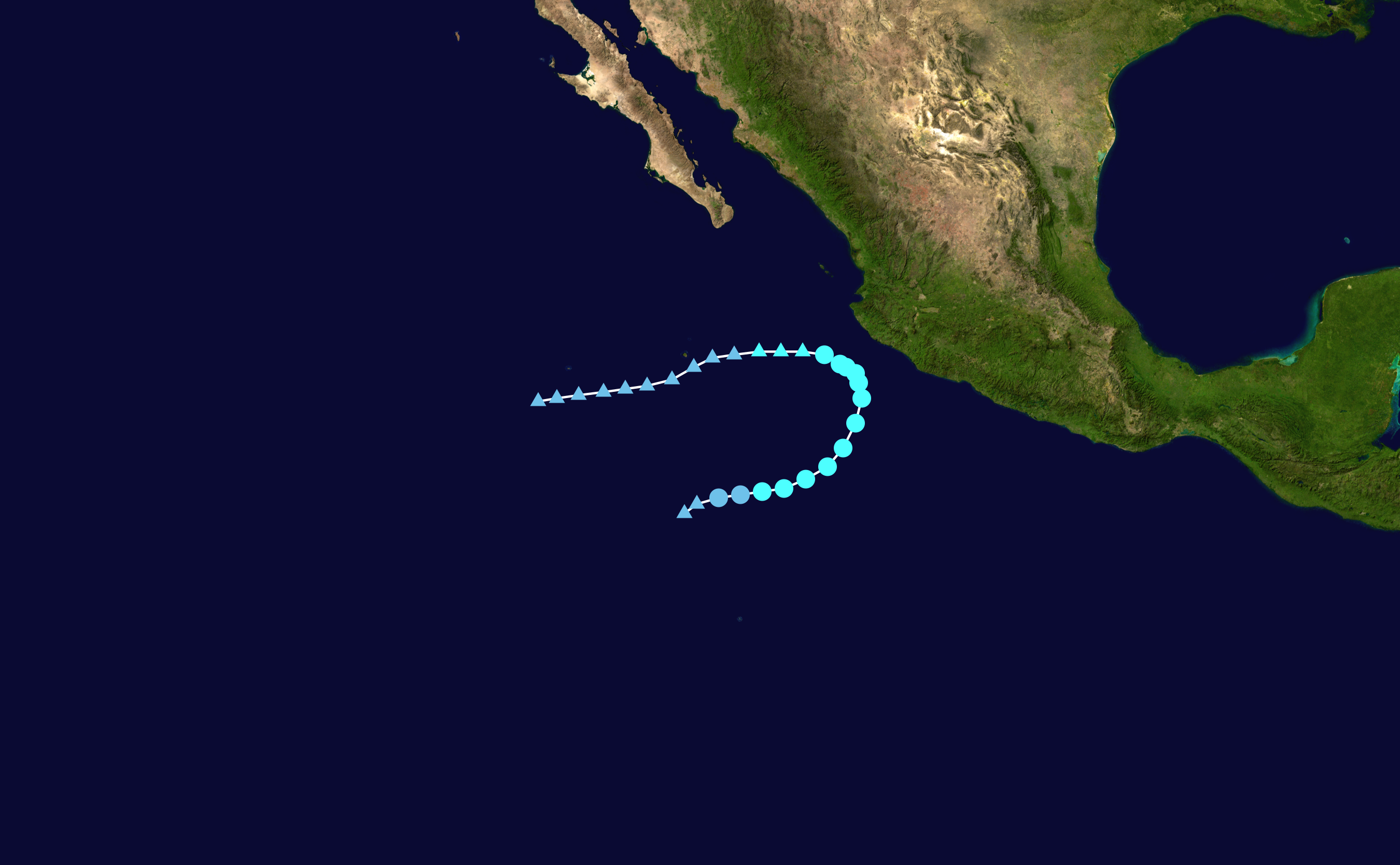
- Duration: November 2 – November 5
- Peak intensity: 65 mph (100 km/h) (1-min); 995 mbar (hPa)

A tropical wave moved off of the western coast of Africa on October 17 and traveled westward across the tropics and the Caribbean Sea with limited thunderstorm activity. The wave moved over Central America on October 26 and later into a cyclonic gyre that extended over a large portion of the Eastern Pacific on October 31. A passing Kelvin wave fueled an increase in convection along the wave, leading to the formation of a low-pressure system. Over the next couple of days, associated convection continued to increase and organize. A tropical depression spawned at 12:00 UTC on November 2, about 520 mi (835 km) southwest of Manzanillo. The nascent depression tracked towards the east-northeast between a mid-level ridge which was located to the southeast and a mid- to upper-level trough which was located to the north and northwest. Despite being located in a region of high southwesterly wind shear, disparate upper-level flows allowed the depression to intensify into Tropical Storm Xavier by 00:00 UTC on November 3. The tropical storm continued to gradually strengthen over the next day and a half. Xavier reached its peak intensity at 12:00 UTC on November 4 with winds of 65 miles per hour (105 km/h) and a pressure of 995 mbar (29.38 inHg), while around 130 mi (210 km) southwest of Manzanillo.

At its closest position to the coast, Xavier was only 90 mi (145 km) southwest of Manzanillo. Meanwhile, the storm turned northward and subsequently entered a region of dry mid-level air and more powerful southwesterly wind shear. This caused Xavier to quickly weaken; the low-level center completely detached from the storm's convection by 12:00 UTC on November 5. Xavier was downgraded to a post-tropical cyclone by 00:00 UTC on November 6. The remnants traveled west-northwest and later west-southwest while continuing to weaken. The post-tropical system opened up into a trough by 00:00 UTC on November 9, while located around 345 mi (555 km) west-southwest of Socorro Island.

=== Other system ===
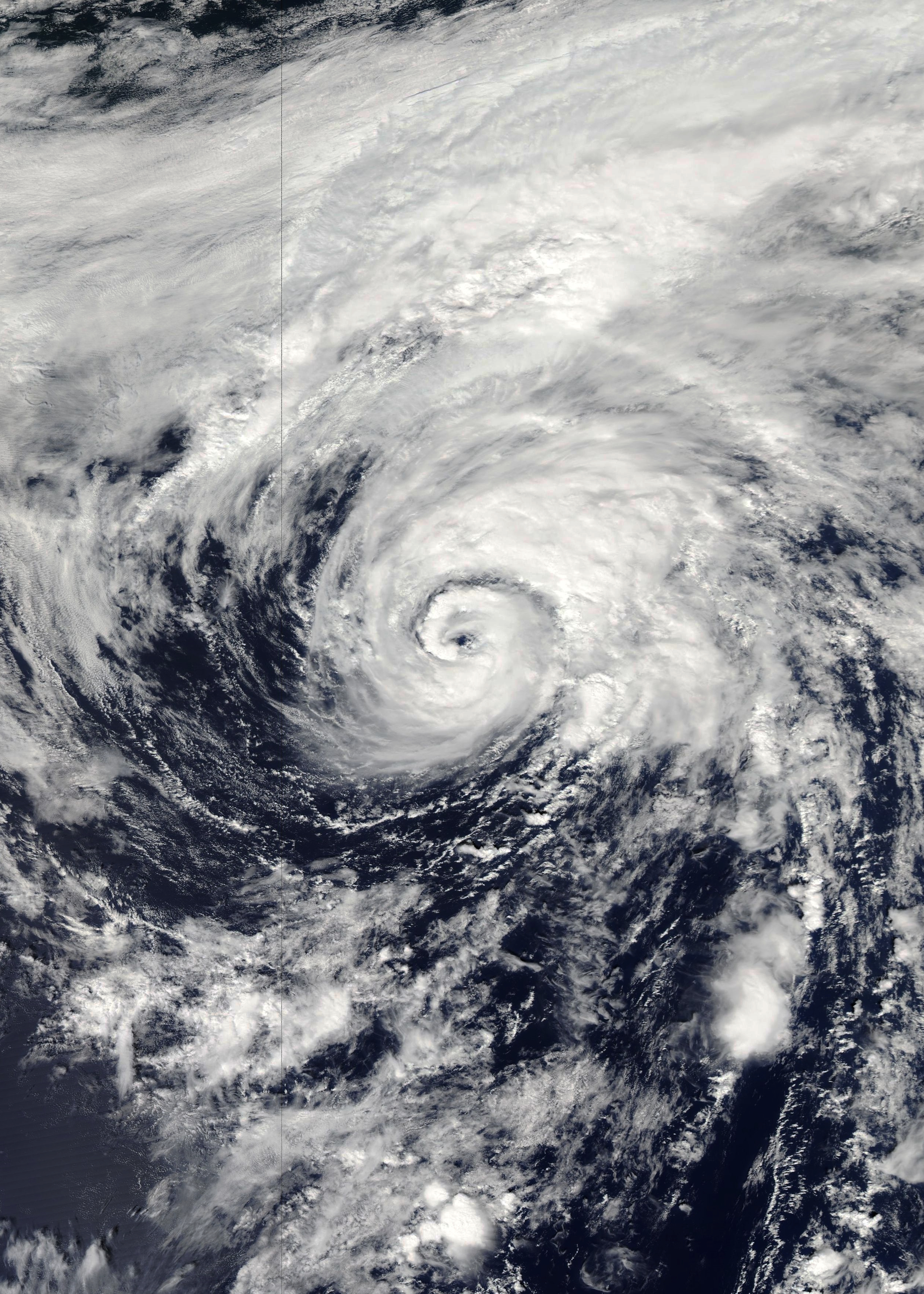
Invest 96C on September 2

An upper-level low absorbed the remnants of Hurricane Lane to the west-northwest of Hawaii on August 29. The system, assigned the designation 96C, traversed an area with sea surface temperatures about 3.6 °F (2 °C) above-normal and became a subtropical cyclone by August 31, according to NWS Honolulu/Central Pacific Hurricane Center. However, the National Oceanic and Atmospheric Administration's Satellite Products and Service Division analyzed it as a tropical storm through the Dvorak technique. That day, scatterometer data revealed that 96C attained peak winds of 45 miles per hour (72 km/h) about 980 mi (1,575 km) south of Adak, Alaska. The system reached its peak intensity early on September 2, displaying an eye feature. Afterwards, 96C gradually began to weaken as it accelerated northward into colder waters. The system transitioned into an extratropical low on September 3 and was absorbed by a larger extratropical storm in the Bering Sea the next day.

== Storm names ==
The following list of names was used for named storms that formed in the North Pacific Ocean east of 140°W during 2018. This was the same list used for the 2012 season, as no names were retired after that season. The name Vicente was used for the first time in 2018. The name Willa had previously been used under the old naming convention. No names were retired from the list following the season, and it was used again for the 2024 season.

- Aletta
- Bud
- Carlotta
- Daniel
- Emilia
- Fabio
- Gilma
- Hector *
- Ileana
- John
- Kristy
- Lane *
- Miriam *
- Norman *
- Olivia *
- Paul
- Rosa
- Sergio
- Tara
- Vicente
- Willa
- Xavier
- Yolanda (unused)
- Zeke (unused)

For storms that form in the North Pacific from 140°W to the International Date Line, the names come from a series of four rotating lists. Names are used one after the other without regard to year, and when the bottom of one list is reached, the next named storm receives the name at the top of the next list. One named storm, listed below, formed within the area in 2018. It was given the last name on List‑4, completing the cycle begun 36 years earlier, when the first name on List‑1 was used during the 1982 season. Named storms in the table above that crossed into the area during the season are noted (*).

- Walaka

== Season effects ==
This is a table of all of the tropical cyclones that formed in the 2018 Pacific hurricane season. It includes their name, duration (within the basin), peak classification and intensities, areas affected, damage, and death totals. Deaths in parentheses are additional and indirect (an example of an indirect death would be a traffic accident), but were still related to that storm. Damage and deaths include totals while the storm was extratropical, a wave, or a low, and all of the damage figures are in 2018 USD.

Saffir–Simpson scale
| TD | TS | C1 | C2 | C3 | C4 | C5 |

2018 Pacific hurricane season statistics
| Storm name | Dates active | Storm category at peak intensity | Max 1-min wind mph (km/h) | Min. press. (mbar) | Areas affected | Damage (US$) | Deaths | Ref(s). |
|---|---|---|---|---|---|---|---|---|
| One-E | May 10–11 | Tropical depression | 35 (55) | 1007 | None | None | None | |
| Aletta | June 6–11 | Category 4 hurricane | 140 (220) | 943 | None | None | None | |
| Bud | June 9–16 | Category 4 hurricane | 140 (220) | 943 | Western Mexico, Baja California Sur, Southwestern United States | $530,000 | 2 | |
| Carlotta | June 14–18 | Tropical storm | 65 (100) | 997 | Southwestern Mexico | >$7.6 million | 2 (1) | |
| Daniel | June 24–26 | Tropical storm | 45 (75) | 1004 | None | None | None | |
| Emilia | June 27 – July 1 | Tropical storm | 60 (95) | 997 | None | None | None | |
| Fabio | June 30 – July 6 | Category 2 hurricane | 110 (175) | 964 | None | None | None | |
| Gilma | July 26–29 | Tropical storm | 45 (75) | 1005 | None | None | None | |
| Nine-E | July 26–27 | Tropical depression | 35 (55) | 1007 | None | None | None | |
| Hector | July 31 – August 13 (Note: Hector did not dissipate on August 13. It crossed the International Date Line, beyond which point it was then referred to as Tropical Storm Hector. It dissipated on August 16.) | Category 4 hurricane | 155 (250) | 936 | Hawaii, Johnston Atoll (before crossover) | Minimal | None | |
| Ileana | August 4–7 | Tropical storm | 65 (100) | 998 | Western Mexico, Baja California Sur | ≥$737,000 | 8 | |
| John | August 5–10 | Category 2 hurricane | 110 (175) | 964 | Western Mexico, Baja California Sur, Southern California | $905,000 | None | |
| Kristy | August 7–12 | Tropical storm | 70 (110) | 991 | None | None | None | |
| Lane | August 15–28 | Category 5 hurricane | 160 (260) | 926 | Hawaii | ≥$250 million | 1 | |
| Miriam | August 26 – September 2 | Category 2 hurricane | 100 (155) | 974 | None | None | None | |
| Norman | August 28 – September 8 | Category 4 hurricane | 150 (240) | 937 | Hawaii | None | None | |
| Olivia | September 1–14 | Category 4 hurricane | 130 (215) | 951 | Hawaii | $25 million | None | |
| Paul | September 8–11 | Tropical storm | 45 (75) | 1002 | None | None | None | |
| Nineteen-E | September 19–20 | Tropical depression | 35 (55) | 1002 | Baja California Sur, Northwestern Mexico | $474 million | 12 (4) | |
| Rosa | September 25 – October 2 | Category 4 hurricane | 150 (240) | 936 | Baja California Peninsula, Northwestern Mexico, Southwestern United States | $51.9 million | 2 (2) | |
| Sergio | September 29 – October 13 | Category 4 hurricane | 140 (220) | 943 | Baja California Peninsula, Northwestern Mexico, Southwestern United States, Texas | $1.34 million | None | |
| Walaka | September 29 – October 6 | Category 5 hurricane | 160 (260) | 921 | Johnston Atoll, Northwestern Hawaiian Islands | Minimal | None | |
| Tara | October 14–17 | Tropical storm | 65 (100) | 995 | Southwestern Mexico | Minimal | None | |
| Vicente | October 19–23 | Tropical storm | 50 (85) | 1002 | Honduras, El Salvador, Guatemala, Southwestern Mexico | >$1 million | 16 | |
| Willa | October 20–24 | Category 5 hurricane | 160 (260) | 925 | Central America, Mexico, Texas | $825 million | 9 | |
| Xavier | November 2–5 | Tropical storm | 65 (100) | 995 | Southwestern Mexico | None | None | |
Season aggregates
| 26 systems | May 10 – November 5 | | 160 (260) | 921 | | >$1.64 billion | 50 (7) | |

== See also ==
- Weather of 2018
- 2006 Central Pacific cyclone
- 2018 Atlantic hurricane season
- 2017–18 Australian region cyclone season
- 2018–19 Australian region cyclone season
- 2018 North Indian Ocean cyclone season
- 2017–18 South Pacific cyclone season
- 2018–19 South Pacific cyclone season
- 2017–18 South-West Indian Ocean cyclone season
- 2018–19 South-West Indian Ocean cyclone season
- List of Pacific hurricanes
- Pacific hurricane season
- Tropical cyclones in 2018
