= Timeline of the 2018 Pacific hurricane season =

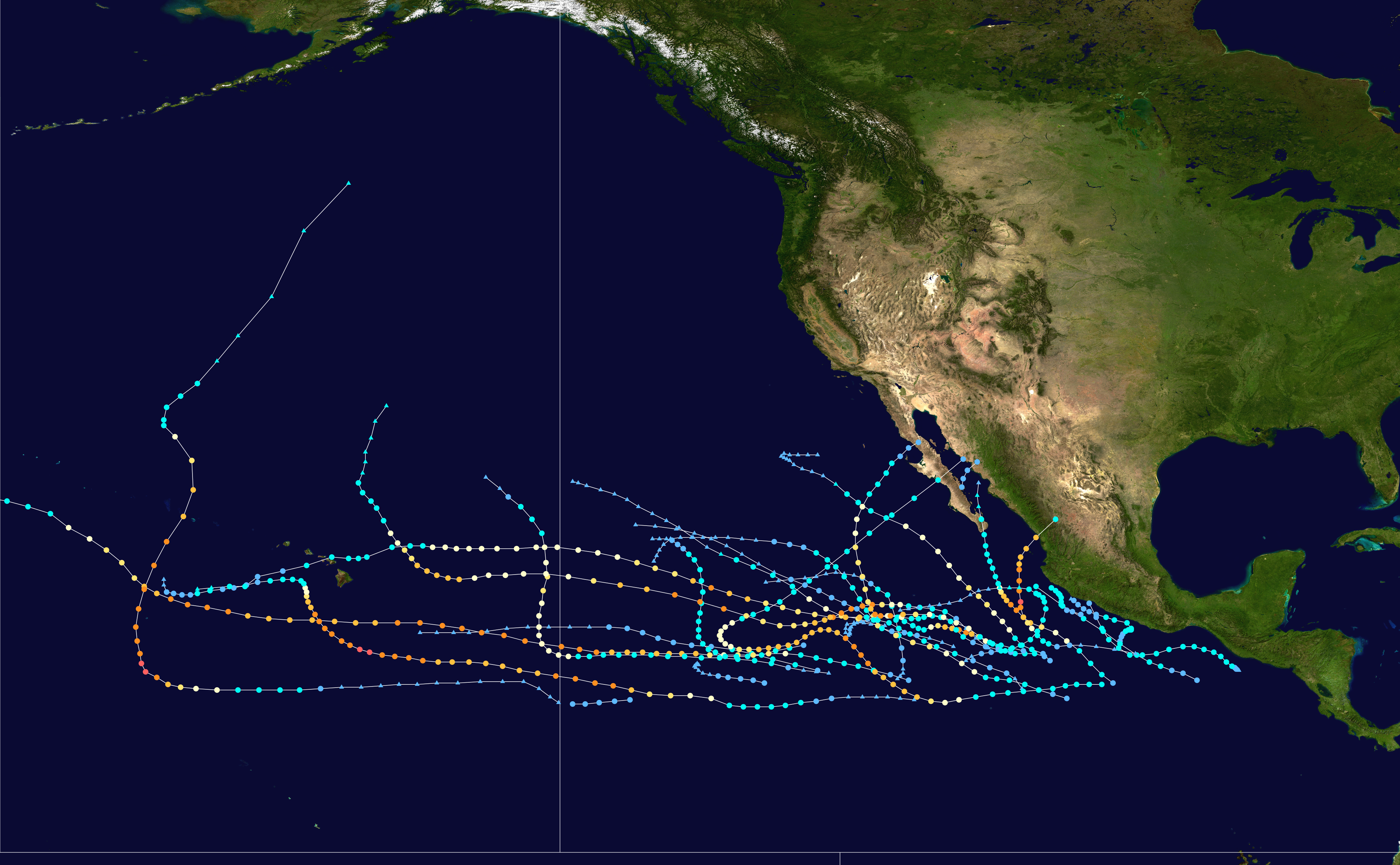
- Season summary map

Season boundaries
- First system formed: May 10, 2018
- Last system dissipated: November 5, 2018

Strongest system
- Name: Walaka
- Maximum winds: 160 mph (260 km/h) (1-minute sustained)
- Lowest pressure: 921 mbar (hPa; 27.2 inHg)

Longest lasting system
- Name: Sergio
- Duration: 13.50 days
Storm articles
- Hurricane Bud (2018)
- Tropical Storm Carlotta (2018)
- Tropical Storm Ileana (2018)
- Hurricane Lane (2018)
- Hurricane Olivia (2018)
- Tropical Depression Nineteen-E (2018)
- Hurricane Rosa (2018)
- Hurricane Sergio (2018)
- Hurricane Walaka
- Tropical Storm Vicente (2018)
- Hurricane Willa

The 2018 Pacific hurricane season was an event in the annual cycle of tropical cyclone formation, in which tropical cyclones form in the eastern Pacific Ocean. The season officially started on May 15 in the eastern Pacific—east of 140°W—and began on June 1 in the central Pacific—the region between the International Date Line and 140°W, and ended on November 30. These dates typically cover the period of each year when most tropical cyclones form in the eastern Pacific basin. The season began with the formation of Tropical Depression One-E, which developed on May 10, and ended with the dissipation of the season's final storm, Tropical Storm Xavier, which dissipated as a tropical cyclone on November 5.

The 2018 hurricane season was exceptionally active and featured the highest Accumulated Cyclone Energy since reliable records began in 1971. Throughout the season, 26 tropical depressions developed, 23 of which became tropical storms. A total of 13 tropical storms reached hurricane strength, and 10 hurricanes achieved major hurricane intensity. (Note: A major hurricane is a storm that ranks as Category 3 or higher on the Saffir–Simpson hurricane wind scale.) The basin saw above-average activity across all regions from the International Date Line to the west coast of Mexico and Central America. Activity peaked from early August to early October, with several long-lived and powerful hurricanes developing in that time period. Several storms severely affected land, such as Hurricane Lane in Hawaii and Hurricane Willa in Mexico. In contrast to the similarly active 2015 Pacific hurricane season, 2018 was not significantly influenced by the El Niño–Southern Oscillation. Instead, low pressures and increased sea surface temperatures associated with the Pacific Meridional Mode supported the development of these intense and long-lived storms.

This timeline documents tropical cyclone formations, strengthening, weakening, landfalls, extratropical transitions, and dissipations during the season. It includes information that was not released throughout the season, meaning that data from post-storm reviews by the National Hurricane Center, such as a storm that was not initially warned upon, has been included.

The time stamp for each event is first stated using Coordinated Universal Time (UTC), the 24-hour clock where 00:00 = midnight UTC. The NHC uses both UTC and the time zone where the center of the tropical cyclone is currently located. The time zones utilized (east to west) are: Central, Mountain, Pacific and Hawaii. In this timeline, the respective area time is included in parentheses. Additionally, figures for maximum sustained winds and position estimates are rounded to the nearest 5 units (miles, or kilometers), following National Hurricane Center practice. Direct wind observations are rounded to the nearest whole number. Atmospheric pressures are listed to the nearest millibar and nearest hundredth of an inch of mercury.

== Timeline of events ==
=== May ===
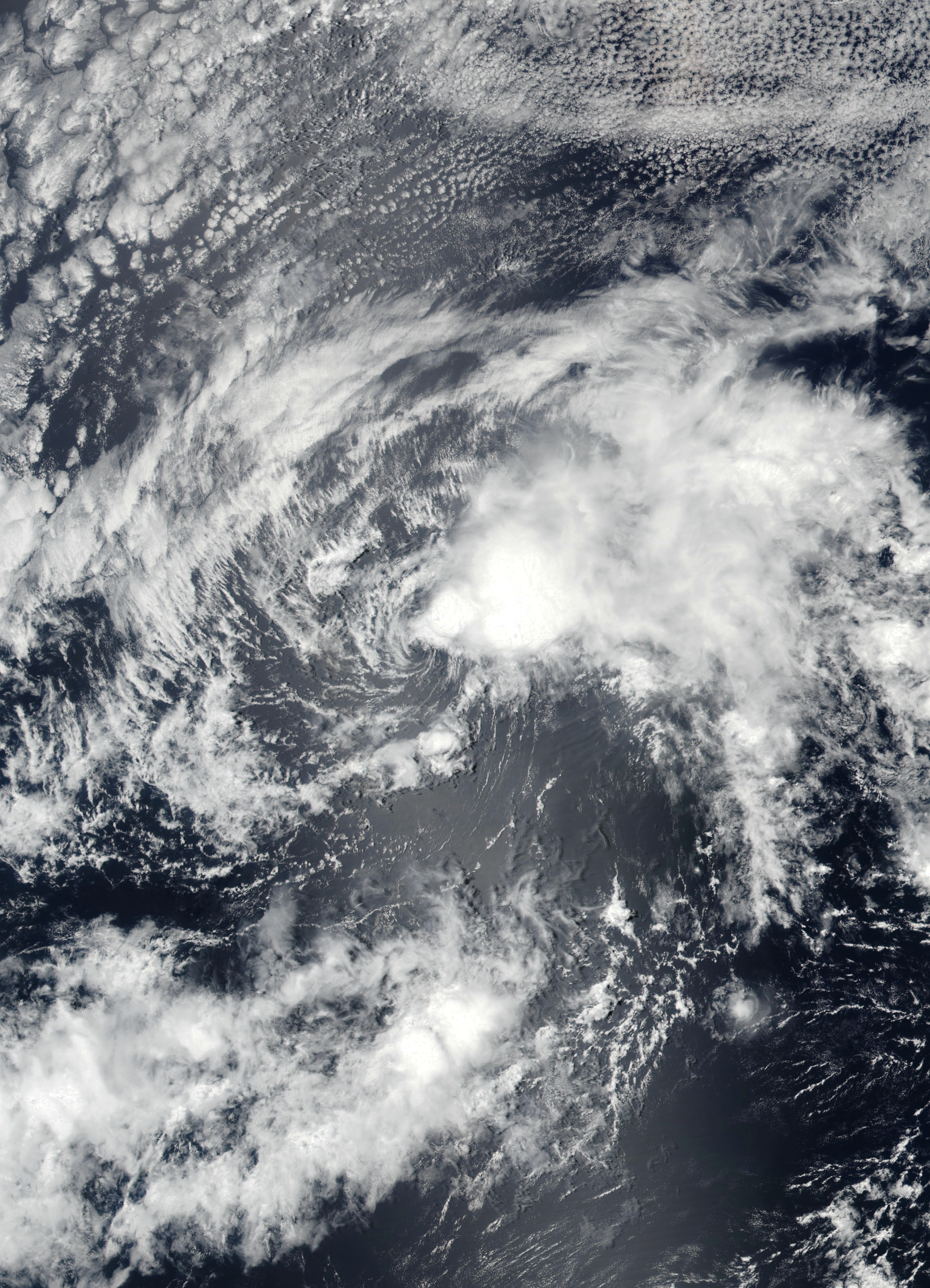
Tropical Depression One-E several hours after being classified as a tropical cyclone on May 10

May 10

- 12:00 UTC (5:00 a.m. PDT) at 12.1°N 125.4°W – Tropical Depression One-E forms from an area of low pressure roughly 1,225 mi (1,970 km) (Note: The figures for maximum sustained winds and position estimates are rounded to the nearest 5 units (miles per hour, kilometers per hour, miles, or kilometers), following the convention used in the National Hurricane Center's operational products for each storm. All other units are rounded to the nearest digit.) southwest of Cabo San Lázaro, Baja California Sur. At the time, this was the second-earliest formation of a tropical cyclone in the Eastern Pacific proper behind Tropical Storm Adrian a year prior. (Note: The record for earliest tropical cyclone formation in the Eastern Pacific is 2020's Tropical Depression One-E on April 25.)
- 18:00 UTC (11:00 a.m. PDT) at 12.3°N 126.2°W – Tropical Depression One-E reaches its peak intensity with maximum sustained winds of 35 mph (55 km/h) and a minimum pressure of 1007 mbar (29.74 inHg), approximately 1,250 mi (2,010 km) southwest of Cabo San Lázaro, Baja California Sur.

May 11

- 18:00 UTC (11:00 a.m. PDT) at 12.7°N 129.3°W – Tropical Depression One-E degenerates into a remnant low roughly 1,390 mi (2,235 km) west-southwest of Cabo San Lázaro, Baja California Sur.

May 15

- The 2018 Eastern Pacific hurricane season officially begins.

=== June ===
June 1

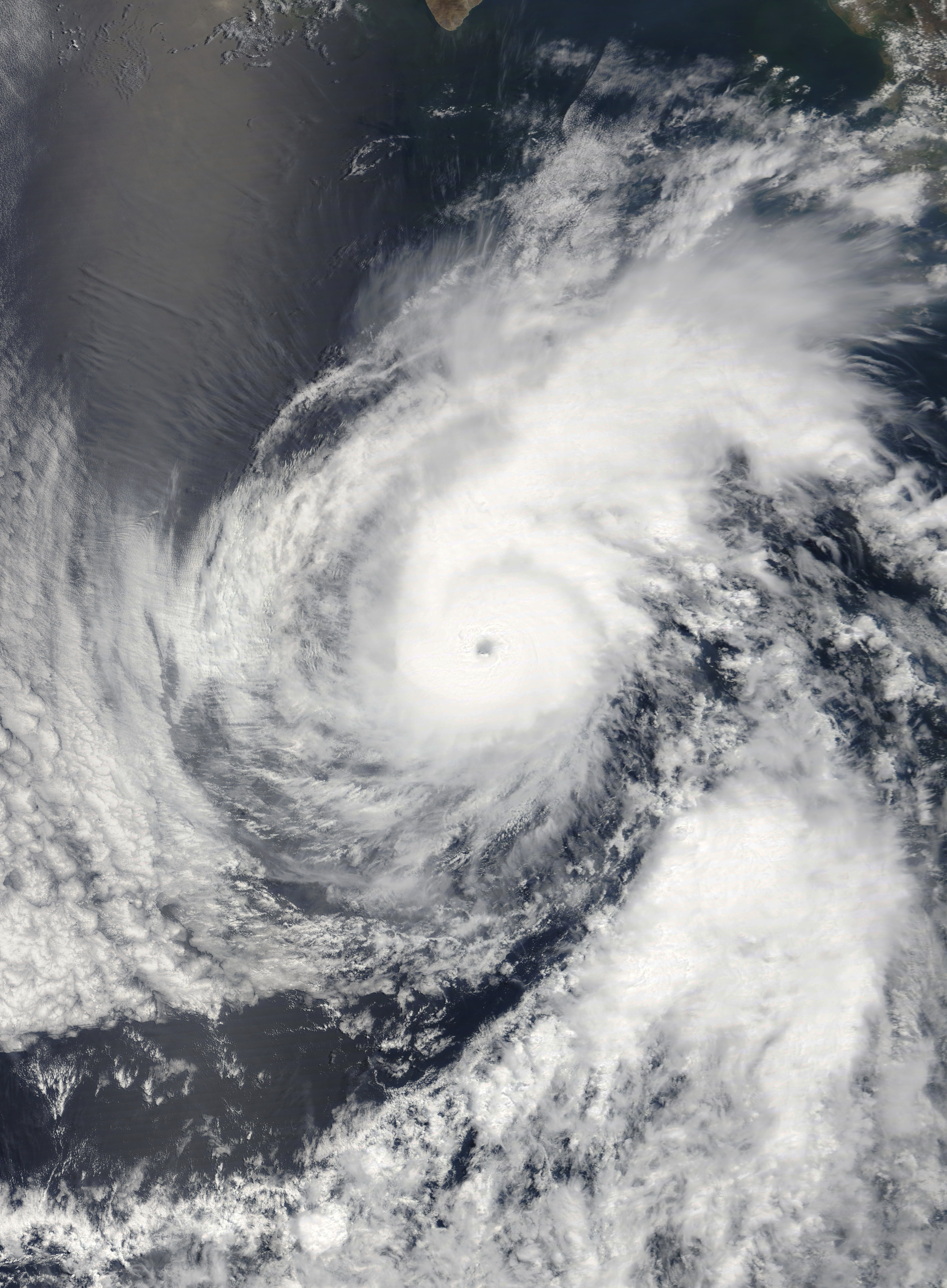
Aletta as a Category 4 hurricane on June 8

- The 2018 Central Pacific hurricane season officially begins.

June 6

- 00:00 UTC (7:00 p.m. CDT, June 5) at 14.0°N 105.4°W – Tropical Depression Two-E develops from an area of low pressure roughly 325 mi (525 km) south-southwest of Punta San Telmo, Michoacán.
- 06:00 UTC (12:00 a.m. MDT) at 14.2°N 106.1°W – Tropical Depression Two-E intensifies into Tropical Storm Aletta roughly 335 mi (540 km) south-southwest of Punta San Telmo, Michoacán.

June 7

- 18:00 UTC (12:00 p.m. MDT) at 15.1°N 109.6°W – Tropical Storm Aletta intensifies into a Category 1 hurricane roughly 425 mi (685 km) southwest of Punta Pérula, Jalisco.

June 8

- 00:00 UTC (6:00 p.m. MDT, June 7) at 15.4°N 110.1°W – Hurricane Aletta intensifies into a Category 2 hurricane roughly 435 mi (700 km) southwest of Punta Pérula, Jalisco.
- 06:00 UTC (12:00 a.m. MDT) at 15.6°N 110.6°W – Hurricane Aletta rapidly intensifies into a Category 3 hurricane about roughly 450 mi (725 km) southwest of Punta Pérula, Jalisco.
- 12:00 UTC (6:00 a.m. MDT) at 15.7°N 111.0°W – Hurricane Aletta quickly strengthens into a Category 4 hurricane roughly 470 mi (755 km) southwest of Punta Pérula, Jalisco. Simultaneously, the storm reaches peak intensity with winds of 140 mph (220 km/h) and a minimum pressure of 943 mbar (27.8 inHg).

June 9

- 00:00 UTC (6:00 p.m. MDT, June 8) at 16.0°N 112.0°W – Hurricane Aletta degenerates into a Category 3 hurricane roughly 490 mi (790 km) south-southwest of Cabo San Lucas, Baja California Sur.
- 12:00 UTC (6:00 a.m. MDT) at 16.2°N 113.0°W – Hurricane Aletta degenerates into a Category 2 hurricane roughly 500 mi (805 km) south-southwest of Cabo San Lucas, Baja California Sur.
- 18:00 UTC (12:00 p.m. MDT) at 16.1°N 113.5°W – Hurricane Aletta degenerates into a Category 1 hurricane roughly 520 mi (835 km) south-southwest of Cabo San Lucas, Baja California Sur.
- 18:00 UTC (1:00 p.m. CDT) at 12.1°N 100.5°W – Tropical Depression Three-E forms about 330 mi (530 km) south of Acapulco.

June 10

- 00:00 UTC (6:00 p.m. MDT, June 9) at 15.9°N 114.0°W – Hurricane Aletta degenerates into a tropical storm roughly 545 mi (875 km) south-southwest of Cabo San Lucas, Baja California Sur.
- 00:00 UTC (7:00 p.m. CDT, June 9) at 12.7°N 101.3°W – Tropical Depression Three-E strengthens into Tropical Storm Bud about 305 mi (490 km) south of Acapulco.
- 18:00 UTC (1:00 p.m. CDT) at 15.1°N 103.8°W – Tropical Storm Bud intensifies into a Category 1 hurricane about 280 mi (450 km) south of Manzanillo, Colima.

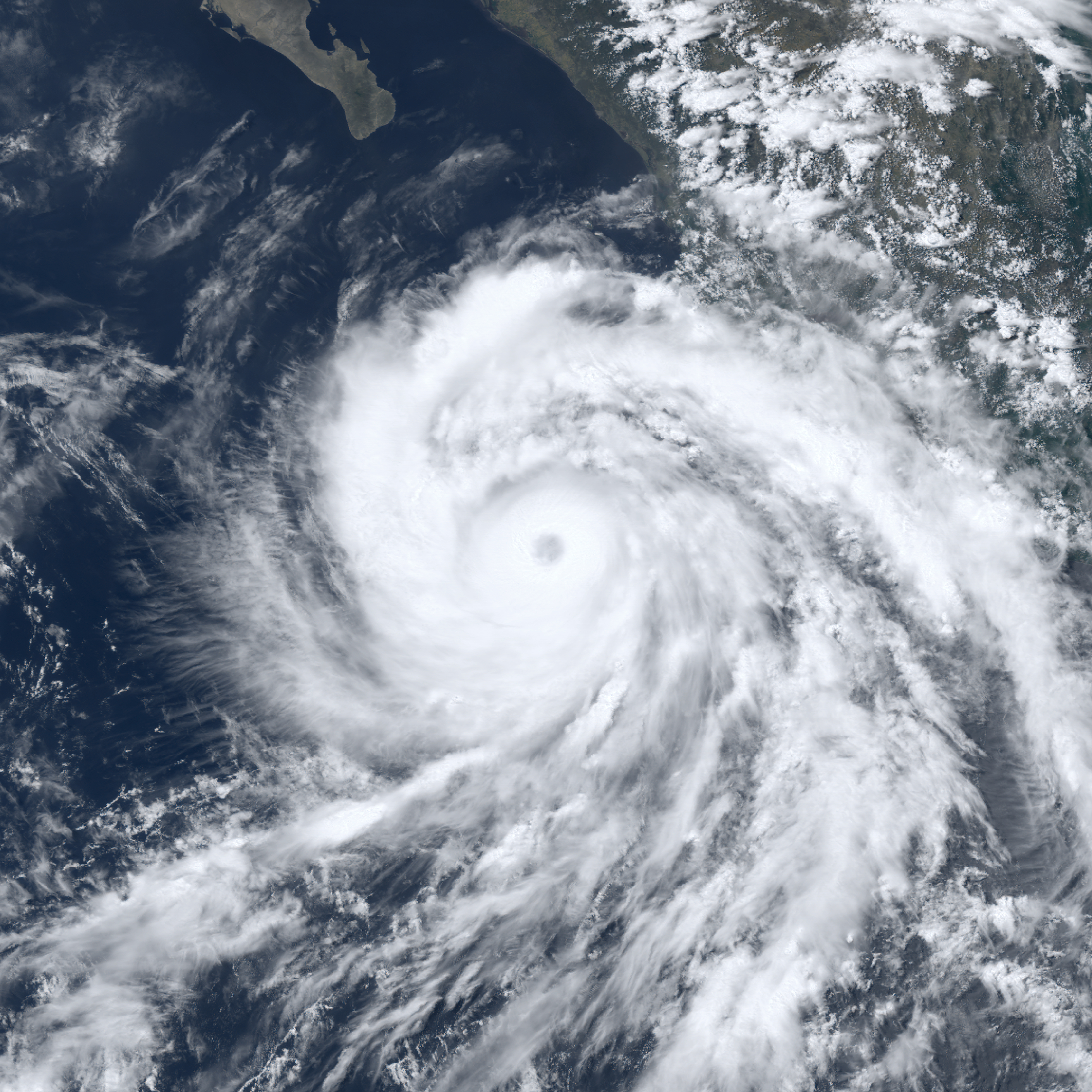
Hurricane Bud intensifying off the coast of Mexico on June 11

June 11

- 06:00 UTC (12:00 a.m. MDT) at 16.1°N 105.6°W – Hurricane Bud intensifies into a Category 2 hurricane about 225 miles (360 km) south-southwest of Manzanillo, Colima.
- 12:00 UTC (8:00 a.m. PDT) at 15.9°N 114.0°W – Tropical Storm Aletta degenerates into a remnant low roughly 640 mi (1,030 km) south-southwest of Cabo San Lázaro, Baja California Sur.
- 12:00 UTC (6:00 a.m. MDT) at 16.4°N 106.4°W – Hurricane Bud intensifies into a Category 3 hurricane about 280 miles (450 km) south-southwest of Cabo Corrientes, Mexico.

June 12

- 00:00 UTC (6:00 p.m. MDT, June 11) at 17.3°N 107.4°W – Hurricane Bud intensifies into a Category 4 hurricane while located about 240 miles (390 km) south-southwest of Cabo Corrientes, Mexico. Simultaneously, it reaches peak intensity with winds of 140 mph (220 km/h) and a minimum pressure of 943 mbar (hPa; 27.85 inHg).
- 12:00 UTC (6:00 a.m. MDT) at 18.0°N 108.1°W – Hurricane Bud weakens into a Category 3 hurricane about 230 miles (365 km) southwest of Cabo Corrientes, Mexico.

June 13

- 00:00 UTC (6:00 p.m. MDT June 12) at 18.5°N 108.5°W – Hurricane Bud weakens into a Category 1 hurricane about 310 miles (500 km) south-southeast of Cabo San Lucas, Mexico.
- 12:00 UTC (6:00 a.m. MDT) at 19.2°N 108.7°W – Hurricane Bud weakens into a tropical storm about 265 miles (430 km) south-southeast of Cabo San Lucas, Mexico.

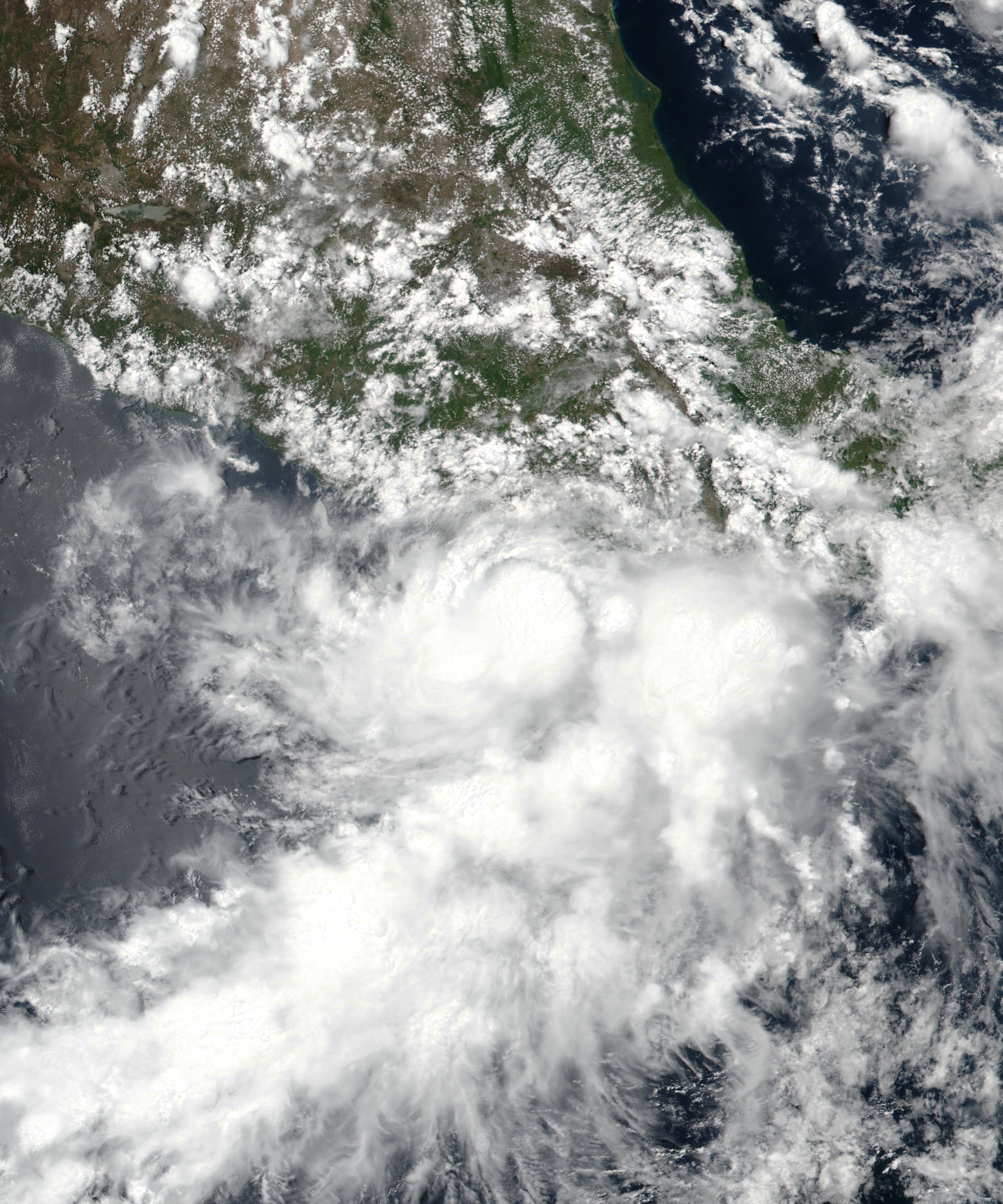
Tropical Storm Carlotta paralleling the coast of Mexico on June 16

June 14

- 18:00 UTC (1:00 p.m. CDT) at 14.9°N 100.0°W – Tropical Depression Four-E develops from an area of low pressure about 140 miles (220 km) south of Acapulco, Mexico.

June 15

- 02:00 UTC (8:00 p.m. MDT, June 14) at 23.0°N 109.7°W – Tropical Storm Bud makes landfall near San José del Cabo, about 15 miles (25 km) east-northeast of Cabo San Lucas, Mexico.
- 12:00 UTC (6:00 a.m. MDT) at 25.3°N 110.0°W – Tropical Storm Bud weakens into a post-tropical cyclone about 140 miles (220 km) south-southwest of Huatabampito, Mexico.
- 18:00 UTC (1:00 p.m. CDT) at 15.8°N 99.6°W – Tropical Depression Four-E intensifies into Tropical Storm Carlotta about 80 miles (125 km) south of Acapulco, Mexico.

June 17

- 00:00 UTC (7:00 p.m. CDT, June 16) at 16.4°N 99.5°W – Tropical Storm Carlotta reaches peak intensity with winds of 65 mph (100 km/h) and a minimum pressure of 997 mbar (hPa; 29.44 inHg), located around 45 miles (70 km) southeast of Acapulco, Mexico.
- 18:00 UTC (1:00 p.m. CDT) at 17.0°N 101.7°W – Tropical Storm Carlotta degenerates into a tropical depression about 45 miles (70 km) south of Zihuatanejo, Mexico.

June 19

- 00:00 UTC (7:00 p.m. CDT, June 18) at 18.1°N 103.5°W – Tropical Depression Carlotta degenerates into a remnant low roughly 85 miles (135 km) west of Lázaro Cárdenas, Mexico.

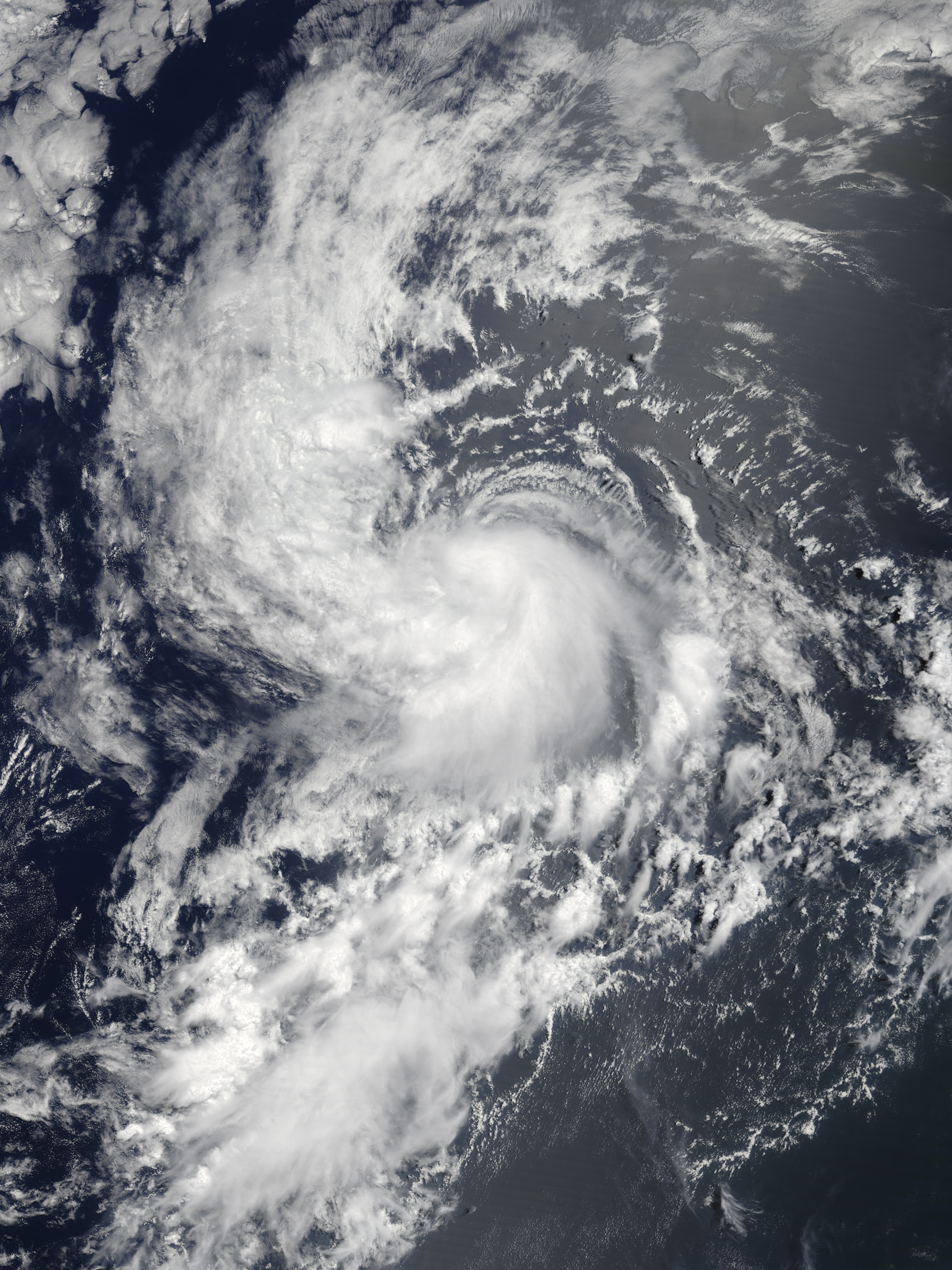
Tropical Storm Daniel on June 24 at peak intensity

June 24

- 00:00 UTC (5:00 p.m. CDT, June 22) at 13.7°N 115.5°W – Tropical Depression Five-E develops from an area of low pressure about 730 miles (1,175 km) southwest of the southern tip of Baja California.
- 12:00 UTC (5:00 a.m. PDT) at 15.5°N 115.8°W – Tropical Depression Five-E intensifies into Tropical Storm Daniel approximately 635 miles (1,020 km) southwest of the southern tip of Baja California.
- 18:00 UTC (11:00 a.m. PDT) at 16.6°N 116.0°W – Tropical Storm Daniel reaches peak intensity with winds of 45 mph (75 km/h) and a minimum pressure of 1004 mbar (hPa; 29.65 inHg), approximately 585 miles (940 km) southwest of the southern tip of Baja California.

June 25

- 18:00 UTC (11:00 a.m. PDT) at 19.2°N 117.8°W – Tropical Storm Daniel degenerates into a tropical depression roughly 565 miles (905 km) west-southwest of the southern tip of Baja California.

June 26

- 06:00 UTC (11:00 p.m. PDT, June 25) at 19.8°N 119.0°W – Tropical Depression Daniel degenerates into a remnant low roughly 615 miles (990 km) west-southwest of the southern tip of Baja California.

June 27

- 18:00 UTC (12:00 p.m. MDT) at 12.8°N 108.1°W – Tropical Depression Six-E forms approximately 505 miles (810 km) southwest of Manzanillo, Colima.

June 28

- 12:00 UTC (6:00 a.m. MDT) at 14.2°N 111.8°W – Tropical Depression Six-E strengthens into Tropical Storm Emilia approximately 610 miles (985 km) south of the southern tip of Baja California.

June 29

- 12:00 UTC (5:00 a.m. PDT) at 16.0°N 115.8°W – Tropical Storm Emilia attains peak intensity with winds of 60 mph (95 km/h) and a minimum pressure of 997 mbar (hPa; 29.44 inHg), roughly 610 miles (980 km) from the southern tip of Baja California.

June 30

- 12:00 UTC (5:00 a.m. PDT) at 17.4°N 118.8°W – Tropical Storm Emilia weakens into a tropical depression roughly 685 miles (1,100 km) west-southwest of the southern tip of Baja California.
- 18:00 UTC (1:00 p.m. CDT) at 11.0°N 103.8°W – Tropical Depression Seven develops from an area of low pressure approximately 560 miles (900 km) south-southwest of Manzanillo, Colima.

=== July ===
July 1

- 06:00 UTC (12:00 a.m. MDT) at 11.6°N 105.8°W – Tropical Depression Seven intensifies into Tropical Storm Fabio about 525 miles (850 km) south-southwest of Manzanillo, Mexico.

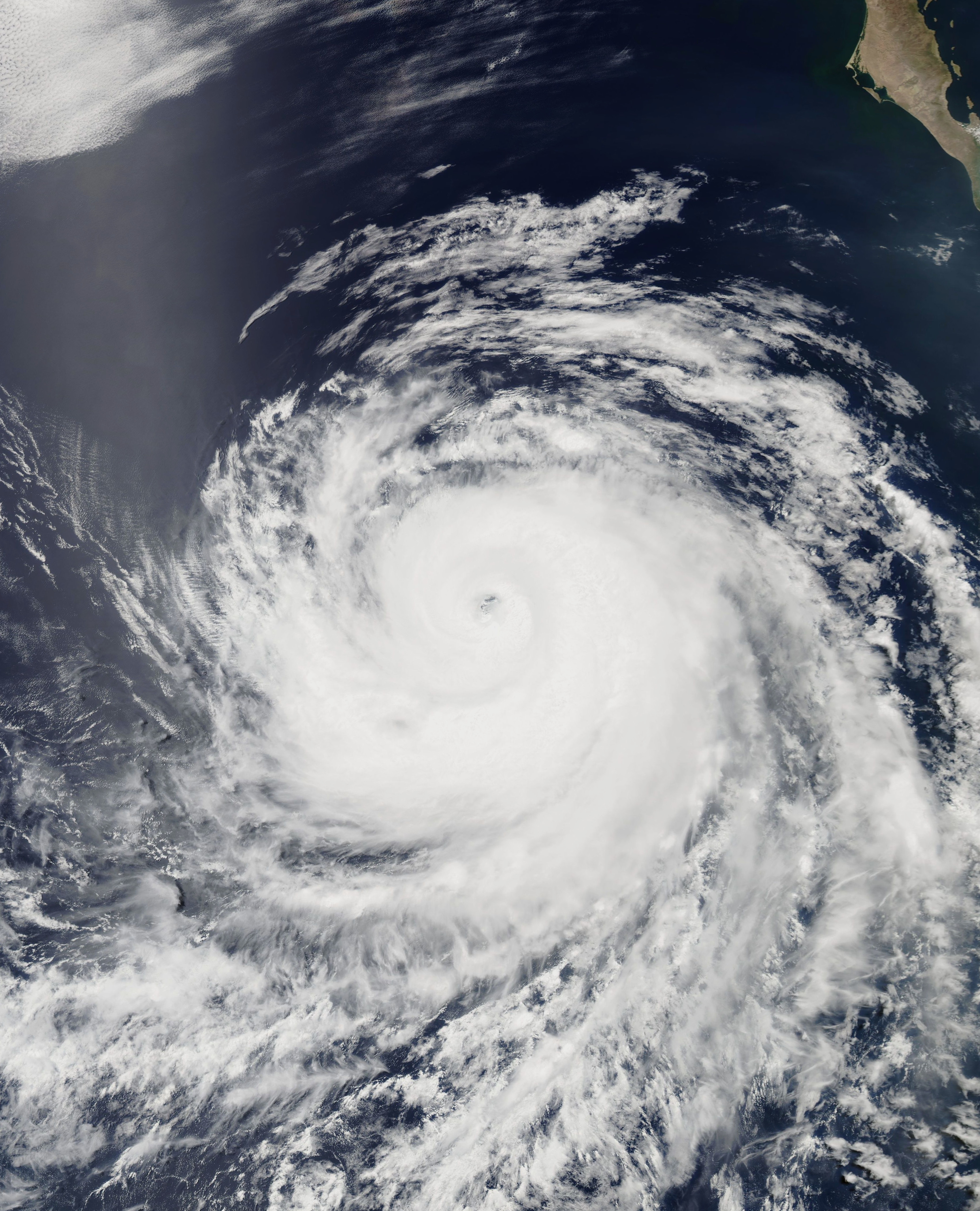
Hurricane Fabio near peak intensity on July 3

July 2

- 00:00 UTC (5:00 p.m. PDT, July 1) at 20.0°N 124.7°W – Tropical Depression Emilia weakens into a remnant low roughly 965 miles (1,555 km) west of the southern tip of Baja California.
- 12:00 UTC (6:00 a.m. MDT) at 12.9°N 110.4°W – Tropical Storm Fabio intensifies into a Category 1 hurricane roughly 690 miles (1,110 km) south of the southern tip of the Baja California Peninsula.

July 3

- 06:00 UTC (11:00 p.m. PDT, July 2) at 14.7°N 113.6°W – Hurricane Fabio intensifies into a Category 2 hurricane approximately 610 miles (985 km) southwest of the southern tip of the Baja California Peninsula.
- 18:00 UTC (11:00 a.m. PDT) at 15.5°N 116.0°W – Hurricane Fabio attains its peak intensity with maximum sustained winds of 110 mph (175 km/h) and a minimum barometric pressure of 964 mbar (hPa; 28.47 inHg) about 640 miles (1,035 km) southwest of the southern tip of the Baja California Peninsula.

July 4

- 18:00 UTC (11:00 a.m. PDT) at 17.4°N 121.0°W – Hurricane Fabio degenerates into a Category 1 hurricane roughly 810 miles (1,300 km) west-southwest of the southern tip of the Baja California Peninsula.

July 5

- 06:00 UTC (11:00 p.m. PDT, July 4) at 19.0°N 123.4°W – Hurricane Fabio weakens into a tropical storm approximately 905 miles (1,455 km) west-southwest of the southern tip of the Baja California Peninsula.

July 6

- 06:00 UTC (11:00 p.m. PDT, July 5) at 21.3°N 128.5°W – Tropical Storm Fabio degenerates into a post-tropical cyclone about 1,190 miles (1,910 km) west of the southern tip of the Baja California Peninsula.

July 26

- 12:00 UTC (5:00 a.m. PDT) at 13.0°N 121.6°W – Tropical Depression Eight-E forms roughly 1,035 miles (1,665 km) southwest of the southern tip of Baja California.
- 18:00 UTC (11:00 a.m. PDT) at 13.4°N 123.2°W – Tropical Depression Eight-E intensifies into Tropical Storm Gilma approximately 1,085 miles (1,745 km) west-southwest of the southern tip of Baja California.
- 18:00 UTC (11:00 a.m. PDT) at 10.9°N 135.0°W – Tropical Depression Nine-E forms roughly 1,435 miles (2,315 km) east-southeast of Hilo, Hawaii.

July 27

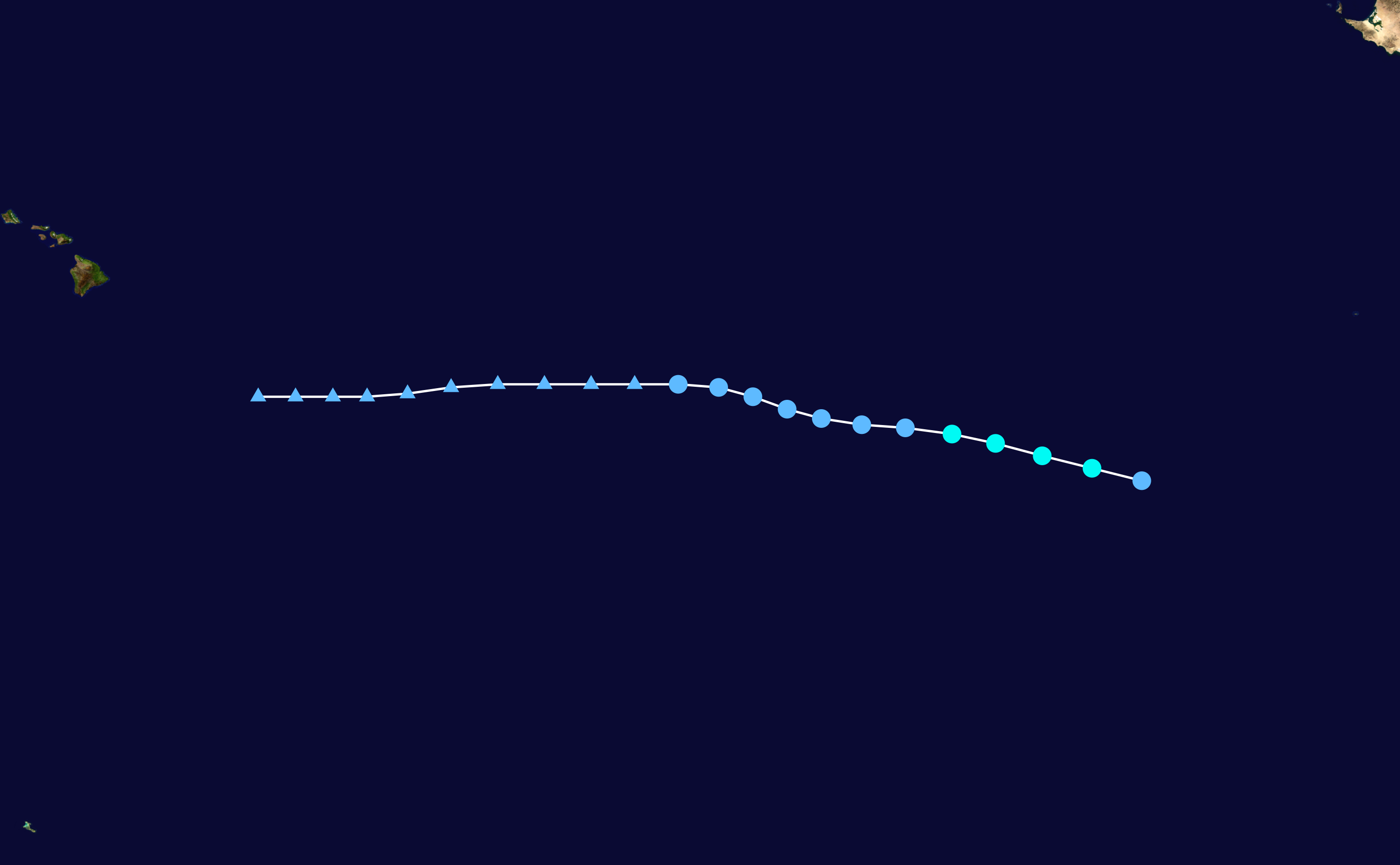
Tropical Storm Gilma's path across the Eastern Pacific Ocean from July 26–29

- 06:00 UTC (11:00 p.m. PDT, July 26) at 14.2°N 126.3°W – Tropical Storm Gilma reaches peak intensity with winds of 45 mph (75 km/h) and a pressure of 1005 mbar (hPa; 29.68 inHg), while located approximately 1,210 miles (1,945 km) west-southwest of the southern tip of Baja California.
- 18:00 UTC (11:00 a.m. PDT) at 14.7°N 129.2°W – Tropical Storm Gilma degenerates into a tropical depression approximately 1,375 miles (2,215 km) west-southwest of the southern tip of Baja California.

July 28

- 00:00 UTC (5:00 p.m. PDT, July 27) – Tropical Depression Nine-E dissipates roughly 1,210 miles (1,945 km) southeast of Hilo, Hawaii.

July 29

- 12:00 UTC (5:00 a.m. PDT) at 16.1°N 137.9°W – Tropical Depression Gilma degenerates into a remnant low roughly 1,150 miles (1,850 km) east of Hilo, Hawaii.

July 31

- 12:00 UTC (5:00 a.m. PDT) at 12.3°N 115.1°W – Tropical Depression Ten-E develops from an area of low pressure about 805 miles (1,295 km) southwest of the southern tip of Baja California.

=== August ===
August 1

- 00:00 UTC (5:00 p.m. PDT, July 31) at 13.0°N 117.6°W – Tropical Depression Ten-E intensifies into Tropical Storm Hector approximately 845 miles (1,360 km) southwest of the southern tip of Baja California.

August 2

- 12:00 UTC (5:00 a.m. PDT) at 14.2°N 123.9°W – Tropical Storm Hector intensifies into a Category 1 hurricane approximately 1,090 miles (1,750 km) west-southwest of the southern tip of Baja California.
- 18:00 UTC (11:00 a.m. PDT) at 14.1°N 125.8°W – Hurricane Hector intensifies into a Category 2 hurricane while located roughly 1,155 miles (1,860 km) west-southwest of the southern tip of Baja California.

August 3

- 12:00 UTC (5:00 a.m. PDT) at 14.1°N 128.3°W – Hurricane Hector degenerates into a Category 1 hurricane while located roughly 1,340 miles (2,160 km) west-southwest of the southern tip of Baja California.
- 18:00 UTC (11:00 a.m. PDT) at 14.1°N 129.3°W – Hurricane Hector re-intensifies into a Category 2 hurricane while located roughly 1,400 miles (2,255 km) west-southwest of the southern tip of Baja California.

August 4

- 00:00 UTC (5:00 p.m. PDT, August 3) at 14.2°N 130.3°W – Hurricane Hector intensifies into a Category 3 hurricane approximately 1,455 miles (2,345 km) west-southwest of the southern tip of Baja California.
- 18:00 UTC (1:00 p.m. CDT) at 12.3°N 94.5°W – Tropical Depression Eleven-E forms from an area of low pressure approximately 270 miles (435 km) south-southeast of Puerto Angel, Oaxaca.

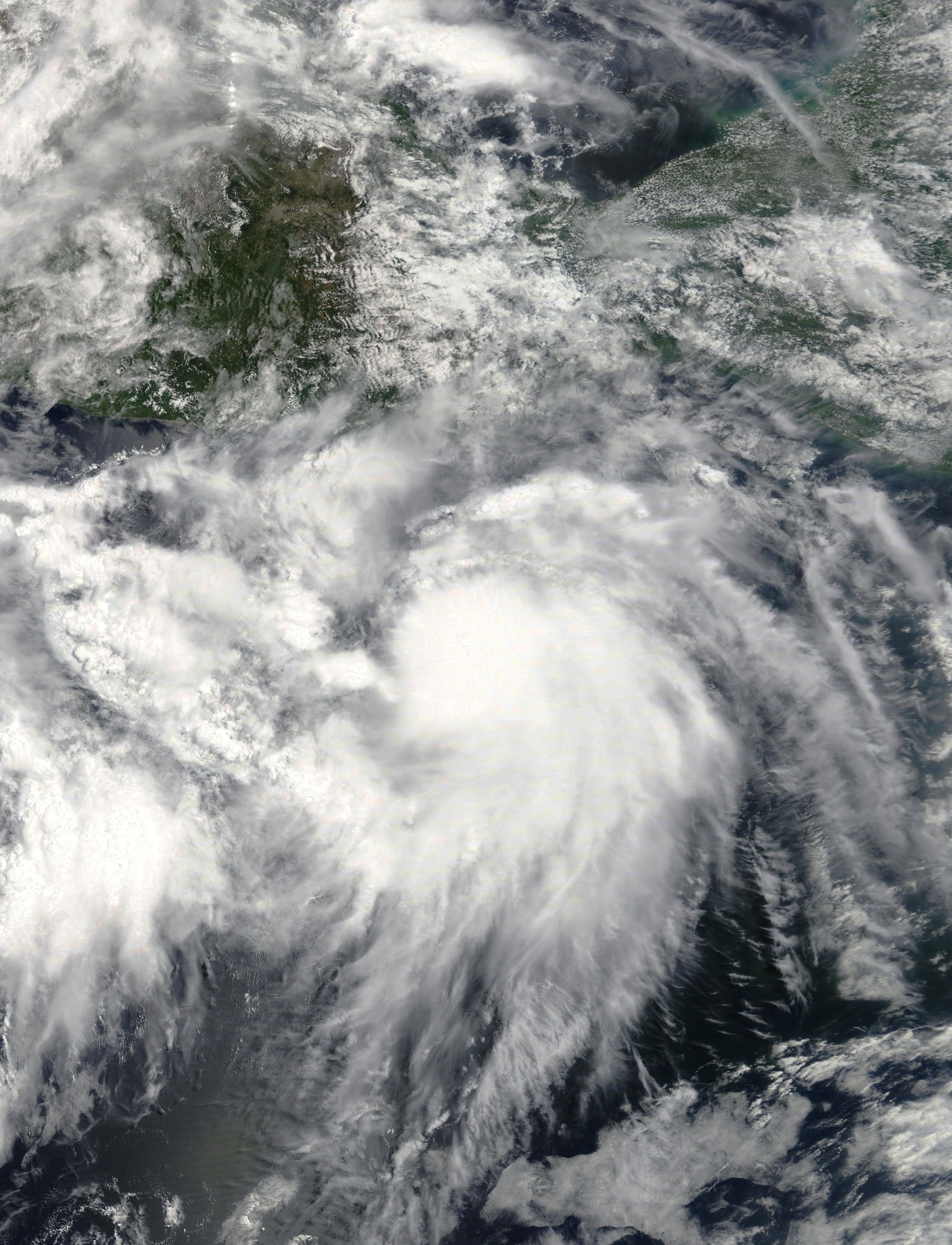
Tropical Storm Ileana near peak intensity off the western coast of Mexico on August 5

August 5

- 12:00 UTC (5:00 a.m. CDT) at 13.3°N 97.1°W – Tropical Depression Eleven-E intensifies into Tropical Storm Ileana approximately 170 miles (275 km) south-southeast of Puerto Angel, Oaxaca.
- 12:00 UTC (7:00 a.m. CDT) at 13.7°N 105.0°W – Tropical Depression Twelve-E forms while located roughly 335 mi (540 km) south-southwest of Punta San Telmo, Michoacán.
- 18:00 UTC (11:00 a.m. PDT) at 14.4°N 138.0°W – Hurricane Hector intensifies into a Category 4 hurricane approximately 1,250 miles (2,015 km) east-southeast of South Point, Hawaii.

August 6

- 00:00 UTC (6:00 p.m. MDT, August 5) at 14.5°N 106.3°W – Tropical Depression Twelve-E intensifies into Tropical Storm John while located roughly 325 mi (525 km) southwest of Punta San Telmo, Michoacán.
- 06:00 UTC (08:00 p.m. HST August 5) at 14.7°N 139.9°W – Hurricane Hector enters the Central Pacific Hurricane Center's (CPHC) area of responsibility.
- 12:00 UTC (5:00 a.m. CDT) at 15.8°N 101.2°W – Tropical Storm Ileana peaks with winds of 65 mph (100 km/h) and a minimum pressure of 998 mbar (29.47 inHg) approximately 170 miles (490 km) southeast of Manzanillo, Mexico.
- 18:00 UTC (08:00 a.m. PDT) at 15.1°N 142.5°W – Hurricane Hector reaches peak intensity with winds of 155 mph (250 km/h) and a minimum pressure of 936 mbar (27.64 inHg) approximately 890 miles (1,430 km) east-southeast of Hilo, Hawaii.
- 18:00 UTC (11:00 a.m. PDT) at 15.9°N 107.9°W – Tropical Storm John intensifies into a Category 1 hurricane while located roughly 310 mi (500 km) southwest of Punta Pérula, Jalisco.
- 18:00 UTC (11:00 p.m. PDT) at 14.8°N 122.6°W – Tropical Depression Thirteen-E forms while located roughly 960 mi (1,545 km) southwest of Cabo San Lázaro, Baja California Sur.

August 7

- 00:00 UTC (5:00 p.m. PDT, August 6) at 14.6°N 123.6°W – Tropical Depression Thirteen-E intensifies into Tropical Storm Kristy while located roughly 1,015 mi (1,635 km) southwest of Cabo San Lázaro, Baja California Sur.
- 12:00 UTC (5:00 a.m. CDT) – Tropical Storm Ileana is absorbed by Hurricane John.
- 12:00 UTC (6:00 a.m. MDT) at 17.7°N 109.5°W – Hurricane John intensifies into a Category 2 hurricane while located roughly 310 mi (500 km) southwest of Cabo Corrientes, Jalisco.
- 18:00 UTC (12:00 p.m. MDT) at 18.3°N 110.1°W – Hurricane John reaches peak intensity with maximum sustained winds of 110 mph (175 km/h) and a minimum pressure of 964 mbar (28.5 inHg) while located roughly 315 mi (505 km) south of Cabo San Lucas, Baja California Sur.

August 8

- 06:00 UTC (12:00 a.m. MDT) at 19.6°N 111.5°W – Hurricane John degenerates into a Category 1 hurricane while located roughly 245 mi (395 km) south-southwest of Cabo San Lucas, Baja California Sur.
- 12:00 UTC (02:00 a.m. HST) at 16.4°N 153.2°W – Hurricane Hector weakens into a Category 3 hurricane approximately 260 miles (420 km) south-southeast of Hilo, Hawaii.

August 9

- 12:00 UTC (5:00 a.m. PDT) at 23.9°N 116.7°W – Hurricane John degenerates into a tropical storm while located roughly 275 mi (445 km) southwest of Punta Abreojos, Baja California Sur.

August 10

- 06:00 UTC (11:00 p.m. PDT, August 9) at 17.8°N 129.9°W – Tropical Storm Kristy reaches peak intensity with maximum sustained winds of 70 mph (110 km/h) and a minimum pressure of 991 mbar (29.3 inHg) while located roughly 1,170 mi (1,885 km) west-southwest of Punta Eugenia, Baja California Sur.
- 06:00 UTC (08:00 p.m. HST, August 9) at 17.2°N 163.7°W – Hurricane Hector re-strengthens into a Category 4 hurricane approximately 385 miles (620 km) east of Johnston Island.
- 18:00 UTC (11:00 p.m. PDT) at 26.3°N 120.3°W – Tropical Storm John degenerates into a remnant low while located roughly 340 mi (545 km) west-southwest of Punta Eugenia, Baja California Sur.

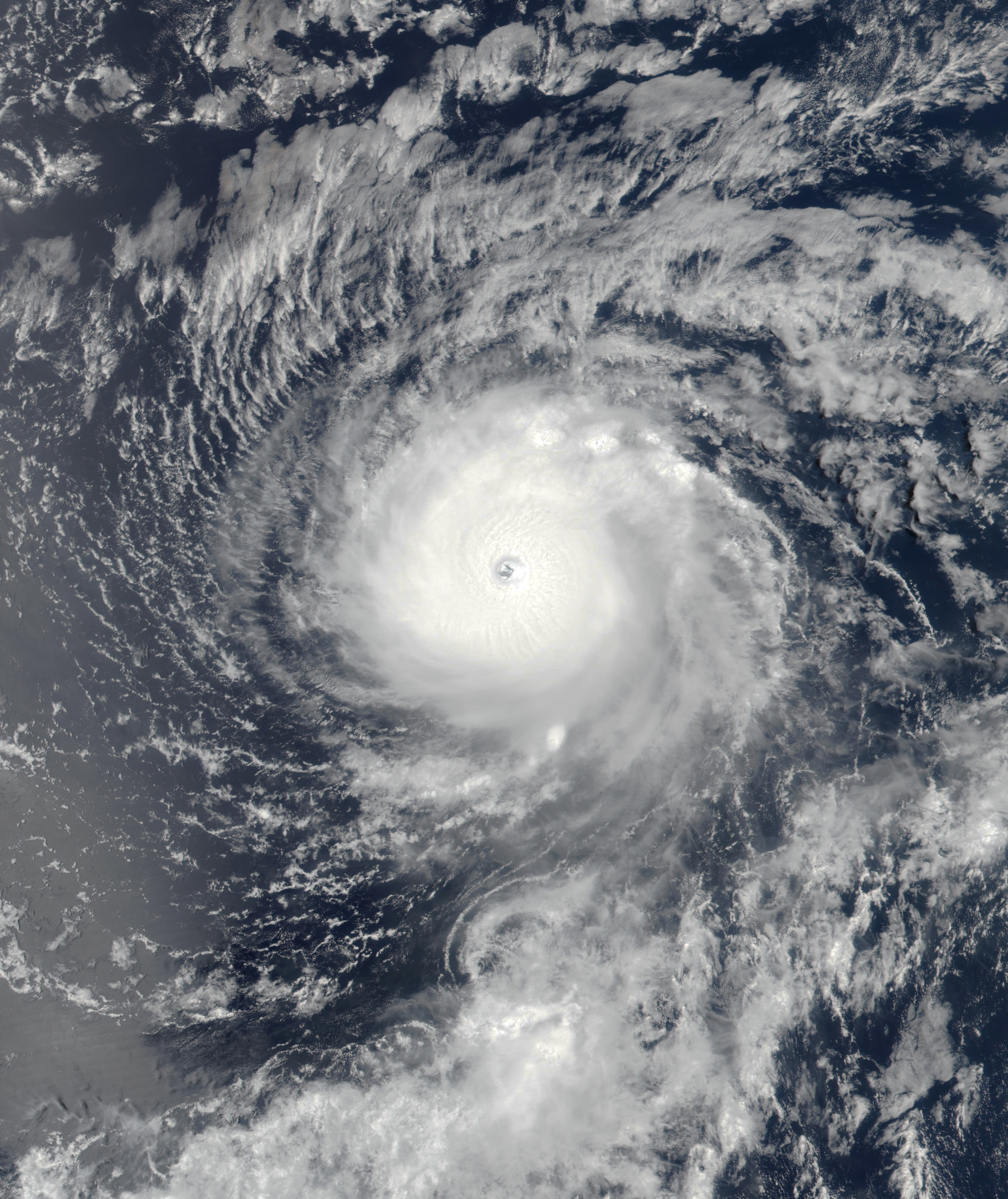
Hector as a high-end Category 4 hurricane on August 6

August 11

- 06:00 UTC (08:00 p.m. HST, August 10) at 17.2°N 163.7°W – Hurricane Hector weakens into a Category 3 hurricane approximately 130 miles (215 km) north-northeast of Johnston Island.
- 12:00 UTC (5:00 a.m. PDT) at 21.7°N 131.2°W – Tropical Storm Kristy weakens into a tropical depression while located roughly 1,095 mi (1,760 km) southwest of Point Conception, California.
- 18:00 UTC (08:00 a.m. HST) at 19.6°N 170.4°W – Hurricane Hector degenerates into a Category 2 hurricane approximately 210 miles (335 km) north-northwest of Johnston Island.

August 12

- 12:00 UTC (02:00 a.m. HST) at 22.4°N 173.6°W – Hurricane Hector weakens into a Category 1 hurricane approximately 320 miles (520 km) southeast of Midway Island.
- 12:00 UTC (5:00 a.m. PDT) at 22.4°N 132.4°W – Tropical Depression Kristy degenerates into a remnant low while located roughly 1,100 mi (1,770 km) southwest of Point Conception, California.

August 13

- 00:00 UTC (02:00 p.m. HST, August 12) at 24.2°N 176.4°W – Hurricane Hector degenerates into a tropical storm approximately 285 miles (455 km) south-southeast of Midway Island.
- 18:00 UTC (08:00 a.m. HST) at 25.1°N 179.5°W – Tropical Storm Hector crosses the International Dateline and enters the Japan Meteorological Agency's area of responsibility.

August 15

- 00:00 UTC (5:00 p.m. PDT, August 14) at 11.0°N 120.6°W – Tropical Depression Fourteen-E forms 1,075 mi (1,730 km) southwest of the southern tip of the Baja California peninsula.
- 12:00 UTC (5:00 a.m. PDT) at 10.7°N 122.8°W – Tropical Depression Fourteen-E strengthens into Tropical Storm Lane 1,195 miles (1,925 km) southwest of the southern tip of the Baja California peninsula.

August 17

- 00:00 UTC (5:00 p.m. PDT, August 16) at 11.0°N 129.2°W – Tropical Storm Lane strengthens into a Category 1 hurricane 1,515 miles (2,440 km) west-southwest of the southern tip of the Baja California peninsula.
- 12:00 UTC (5:00 a.m. PDT) at 11.2°N 132.1°W – Hurricane Lane strengthens into a Category 2 hurricane 1,670 miles (2,690 km) west-southwest of the southern tip of the Baja California peninsula.

August 18

- 00:00 UTC (5:00 p.m. PDT, August 17) at 11.6°N 134.9°W – Hurricane Lane strengthens into a Category 3 hurricane 1,810 miles (2,915 km) west-southwest of the southern tip of the Baja California peninsula.
- 06:00 UTC (11:00 p.m. PDT, August 17) at 11.9°N 136.2°W – Hurricane Lane strengthens into a Category 4 hurricane 1,885 miles (3,035 km) west-southwest of the southern tip of the Baja California peninsula.

August 19

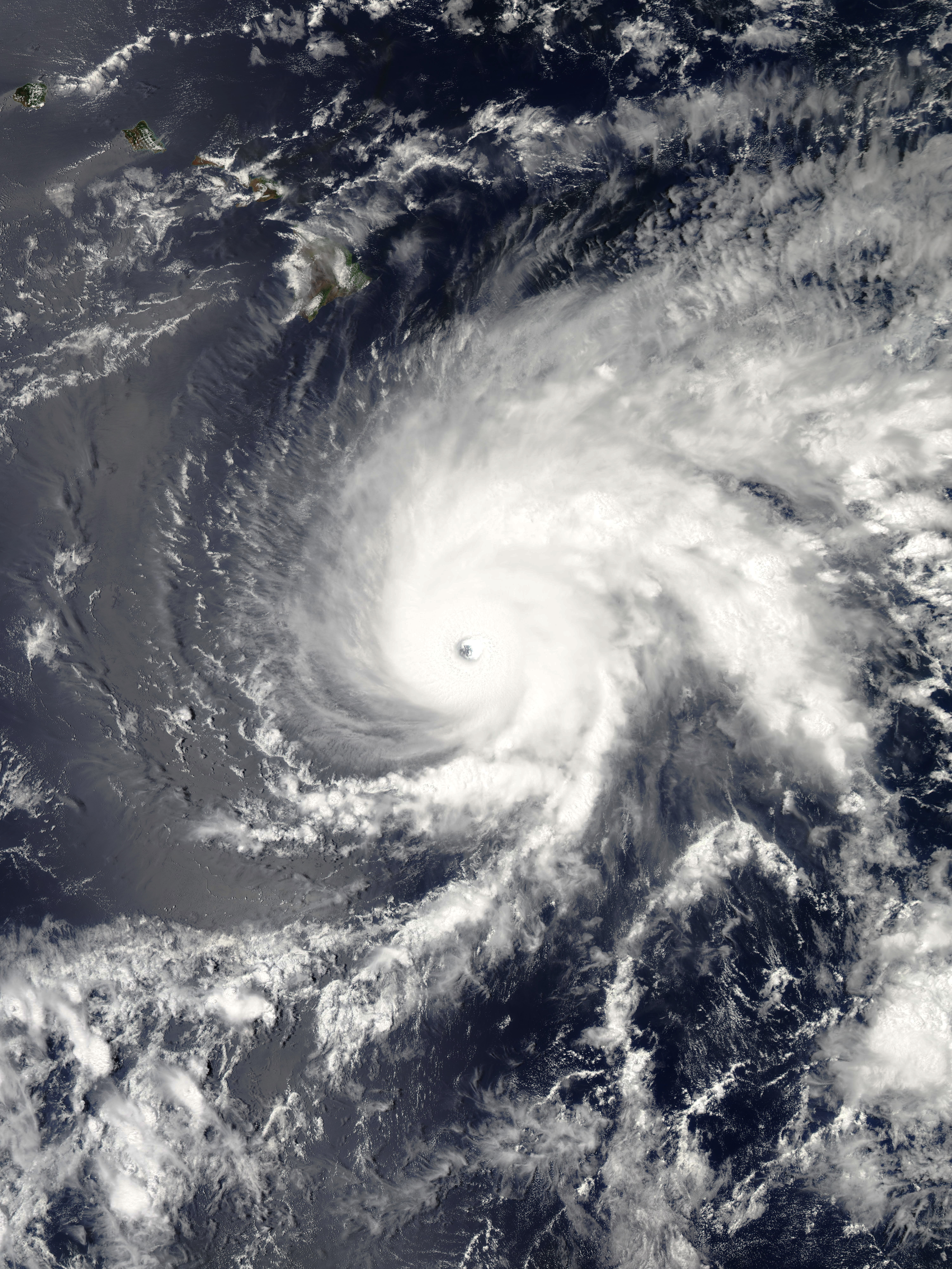
Hurricane Lane at Category 5 intensity early on August 22

- 00:00 UTC (2:00 p.m. HST, August 18) at 12.6°N 140.3°W – Hurricane Lane enters the CPHC's area of responsibility.
- 06:00 UTC (8:00 p.m. HST, August 18) at 12.8°N 141.6°W – Hurricane Lane degenerates into a Category 3 hurricane 1,015 miles (1,635 km) east-southeast of Hilo, Hawaii.

August 21

- 00:00 UTC (2:00 p.m. HST, August 20) at 13.7°N 149.8°W – Hurricane Lane restrengthens into a Category 4 hurricane 540 miles (870 km) southeast of Hilo, Hawaii.

August 22

- 00:00 UTC (2:00 p.m. HST, August 21) at 14.3°N 153.6°W – Hurricane Lane strengthens into a Category 5 hurricane 385 miles (620 km) south-southeast of Hilo, Hawaii.
- 06:00 UTC (8:00 p.m. HST, August 21) at 14.5°N 154.3°W – Hurricane Lane peaks with winds of 160 mph (260 km/h) and a minimum pressure of 926 mbar (27.3 inHg), about 360 miles (580 km) south of Hilo, Hawaii.
- 12:00 UTC (2:00 a.m. HST) at 14.8°N 155.0°W – Hurricane Lane degenerates into a Category 4 hurricane 340 miles (545 km) south of Hilo, Hawaii.

August 24

- 00:00 UTC (2:00 p.m. HST, August 23) at 17.5°N 157.8°W – Hurricane Lane weakens into a Category 3 hurricane 235 miles (380 km) southwest of Hilo, Hawaii.
- 12:00 UTC (2:00 a.m. HST) at 18.3°N 158.1°W – Hurricane Lane degenerates into a Category 2 hurricane 220 miles (355 km) west-southwest of Hilo, Hawaii.
- 18:00 UTC (8:00 a.m. HST) at 18.6°N 158.1°W – Hurricane Lane weakens into a Category 1 hurricane 210 miles (340 km) west-southwest of Hilo, Hawaii.

August 25

- 06:00 UTC (8:00 p.m. HST, August 24) at 19.2°N 158.3°W – Hurricane Lane degenerates into a tropical storm 210 miles (340 km) west of Hilo, Hawaii.

August 26

- 06:00 UTC (11:00 p.m. PDT, August 25) at 13.2°N 123.7°W – Tropical Depression Fifteen-E forms from an area of low pressure approximately 1,130 miles (1,820 km) west-southwest of the southern tip of Baja California.
- 12:00 UTC (2:00 a.m. HST) at 19.3°N 161.6°W – Tropical Storm Lane weakens into a tropical depression 425 miles (685 km) west of Hilo, Hawaii.
- 12:00 UTC (5:00 a.m. PDT) at 13.5°N 124.9°W – Tropical Depression Fifteen-E strengthens into Tropical Storm Miriam approximately 1,175 miles (1,890 km) west-southwest of the southern tip of Baja California.

August 27

- 12:00 UTC (2:00 a.m. HST) at 18.7°N 165.0°W – Tropical Depression Lane restrengthens into a tropical storm 325 miles (525 km) east-northeast of Johnston Island.

August 28

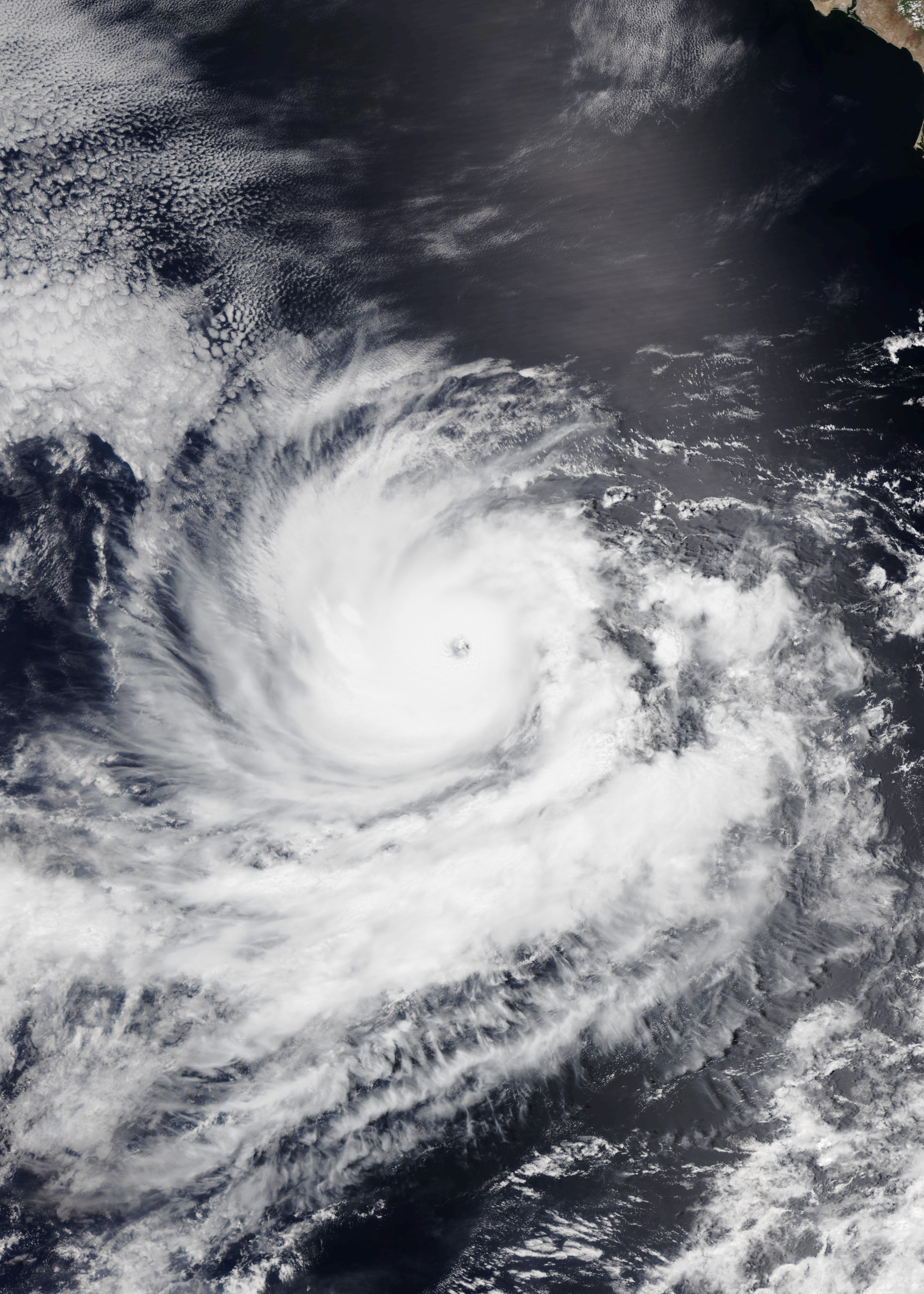
Hurricane Norman peaking as a Category 4 hurricane on August 30

- 00:00 UTC (2:00 p.m. HST, August 27) at 18.4°N 166.4°W – Tropical Storm Lane degenerates into a tropical depression 235 miles (380 km) northeast of Johnston Island.
- 12:00 UTC (5:00 a.m. PDT) at 16.7°N 111.7°W – Tropical Depression Sixteen-E forms from an area of low pressure approximately 490 miles (790 km) west-southwest of Manzanillo, Mexico.
- 18:00 UTC (11:00 a.m. PDT) at 17.2°N 112.5°W – Tropical Depression Sixteen-E strengthens into Tropical Storm Norman approximately 555 miles (895 km) west-southwest of Manzanillo, Mexico.

August 29

- 00:00 UTC (2:00 p.m. HST, August 28) at 19.1°N 168.3°W – Tropical Depression Lane weakens into a remnant low 185 miles (300 km) north-northeast of Johnston Island.
- 18:00 UTC (11:00 a.m. PDT) at 14.0°N 139.4°W – Tropical Storm Miriam strengthens into a Category 1 hurricane approximately 2,025 miles (3,260 km) west-southwest of the southern tip of Baja California.
- 18:00 UTC (11:00 a.m. PDT) at 17.7°N 115.7°W – Tropical Storm Norman strengthens into a Category 1 hurricane approximately 755 miles (1,215 km) west-southwest of Manzanillo, Mexico.

August 30

- 00:00 UTC (2:00 p.m. HST, August 29) at 14.1°N 140.1°W – Hurricane Miriam enters the CPHC's area of responsibility.
- 06:00 UTC (11:00 p.m. PDT, August 29) at 17.7°N 117.0°W – Hurricane Norman strengthens into a Category 2 hurricane approximately 835 miles (1,345 km) west-southwest of Manzanillo, Mexico.
- 12:00 UTC (5:00 a.m. PDT) at 17.7°N 117.7°W – Hurricane Norman strengthens into a Category 4 hurricane approximately 885 miles (1,425 km) west-southwest of Manzanillo, Mexico.
- 18:00 UTC (11:00 a.m. PDT) at 17.6°N 118.4°W – Hurricane Norman peaks with winds of 150 mph (240 km/h) and a minimum pressure of 937 mbar (27.7 inHg), approximately 520 miles (835 km) southwest of the southern tip of Baja California.

August 31

- 18:00 UTC (8:00 a.m. HST) at 18.7°N 141.2°W – Hurricane Miriam peaks as a Category 2 hurricane with winds of 100 mph (155 km/h) and a minimum pressure of 974 mbar (28.8 inHg) approximately 910 miles (1,465 km) east of Hilo, Hawaii.
- 18:00 UTC (11:00 a.m. PDT) at 16.6°N 121.1°W – Hurricane Norman degenerates into a Category 3 hurricane approximately 845 miles (1,360 km) southwest of the southern tip of Baja California.

=== September ===
September 1

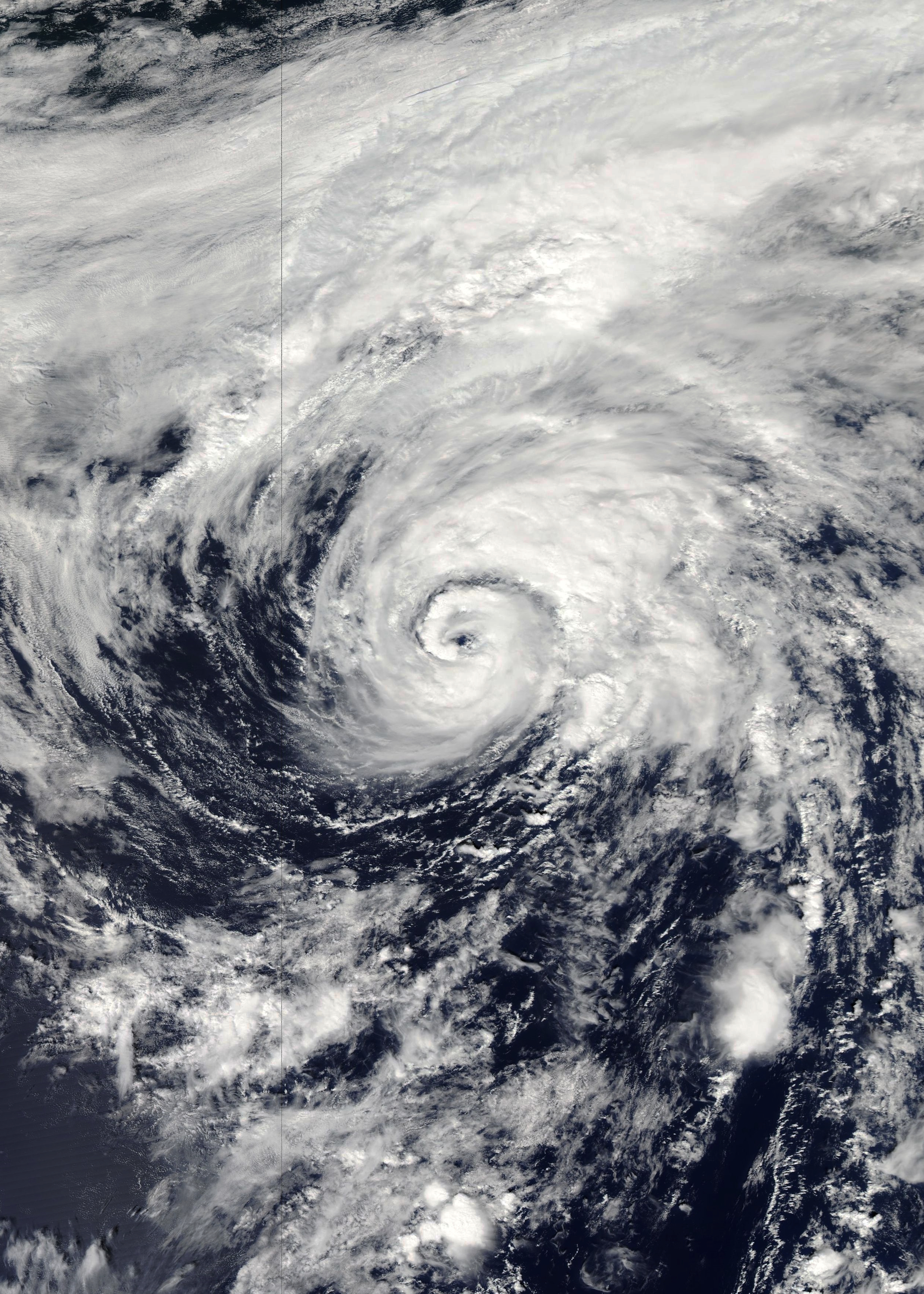
The unclassified tropical or subtropical cyclone near the International Dateline on September 2

- 00:00 UTC (5:00 p.m. PDT, August 31) at 14.3°N 107.8°W – Tropical Depression Seventeen-E forms about 365 mi (590 km) southeast of Socorro Island.
- 06:00 UTC (8:00 p.m. HST, August 31) at 20.7°N 141.0°W – Hurricane Miriam weakens into a Category 1 hurricane approximately 915 miles (1,475 km) east of Hilo, Hawaii.
- 06:00 UTC (11:00 p.m. PDT, August 31) at 16.3°N 122.5°W – Hurricane Norman degenerates into a Category 2 hurricane approximately 935 miles (1,505 km) southwest of the southern tip of Baja California.
- 17:30 UTC (7:30 a.m. HST) at 37.2°N 177.8°W – An upper-level low, designated Invest 96C, that absorbed the remnants of Hurricane Lane transitions into a tropical or subtropical cyclone approximately 1,015 mi (1,635 km) south of Adak, Alaska. While the system was assessed as subtropical by the Central Pacific Hurricane Center, the National Oceanic and Atmospheric Administration's Satellite Products and Service Division analyzed it as a tropical storm through the Dvorak technique.
- 18:00 UTC (8:00 a.m. HST) at 22.8°N 141.3°W – Hurricane Miriam weakens into a tropical storm approximately 915 miles (1,475 km) east-northeast of Hilo, Hawaii.
- 23:30 UTC (1:30 p.m. HST) at 38.7°N 178.1°W – Scatterometer data reveals Invest 96C to have attained peak winds of 45 mph (75 km/h) about 980 mi (1,575 km) south of Adak, Alaska.

September 2

- 00:00 UTC (5:00 p.m. PDT, September 1) at 15.4°N 111.2°W – Tropical Depression Seventeen-E strengthens into Tropical Storm Olivia about 230 mi (370 km) south of Socorro Island.
- 12:00 UTC (2:00 a.m. HST) at 25.4°N 143.7°W – Tropical Storm Miriam degenerates into a tropical depression approximately 825 miles (1,330 km) northeast of Hilo, Hawaii.
- 12:00 UTC (5:00 a.m. PDT) at 17.4°N 128.3°W – Hurricane Norman strengthens into a Category 4 hurricane approximately 1,250 miles (2,010 km) west-southwest of the southern tip of Baja California.
- 17:30 UTC (7:30 a.m. HST) at 40.6°N 177.1°W – Dvorak assessments of Invest 96C indicate it to have weakened into a tropical depression about 780 mi (1,255 km) south of Adak, Alaska.
- 18:00 UTC (8:00 a.m. HST) at 26.0°N 144.3°W – Tropical Depression Miriam weakens into a remnant low approximately 815 miles (1,310 km) northeast of Hilo, Hawaii.

September 3

- 5:30 UTC (7:30 p.m. HST, September 2) at 42.6°N 178.3°W – The Satellite Products and Service Division issues its final bulletin on Invest 96C as Dvorak assessments indicate the system to be too weak to classify as a tropical cyclone about 645 mi (1,040 km) south of Adak, Alaska.
- 06:00 UTC (11:00 p.m. PDT, September 2) at 18.8°N 133.8°W – Hurricane Norman degenerates into a Category 3 hurricane approximately 1,565 miles (2,520 km) west-southwest of the southern tip of Baja California.
- 18:00 UTC (11:00 a.m. PDT) at 19.4°N 137.6°W – Hurricane Norman weakens into a Category 2 hurricane approximately 1,795 miles (2,890 km) west-southwest of the southern tip of Baja California.

September 4

- 00:00 UTC (5:00 p.m. PDT, September 3) at 19.7°N 139.4°W – Hurricane Norman degenerates into a Category 1 hurricane approximately 1,905 miles (3,065 km) west-southwest of the southern tip of Baja California.
- 00:00 UTC (2:00 p.m. HST, September 3) at 19.7°N 139.4°W – Hurricane Norman crosses into the Central Pacific Hurricane Center's area of responsibility.
- 00:00 UTC (5:00 p.m. PDT, September 3) at 16.8°N 115.6°W – Tropical Storm Olivia intensifies into a Category 1 hurricane approximately 120 mi (195 km) southwest of Clarion Island.
- 12:00 UTC (5:00 a.m. PDT) at 16.9°N 117.6°W – Hurricane Olivia rapidly intensifies into a Category 2 hurricane about 215 mi (345 km) west-southwest of Clarion Island.
- 18:00 UTC (11:00 a.m. PDT) at 16.8°N 118.6°W – Hurricane Olivia rapidly intensifies into a Category 3 hurricane about 275 mi (440 km) west-southwest of Clarion Island.

September 5

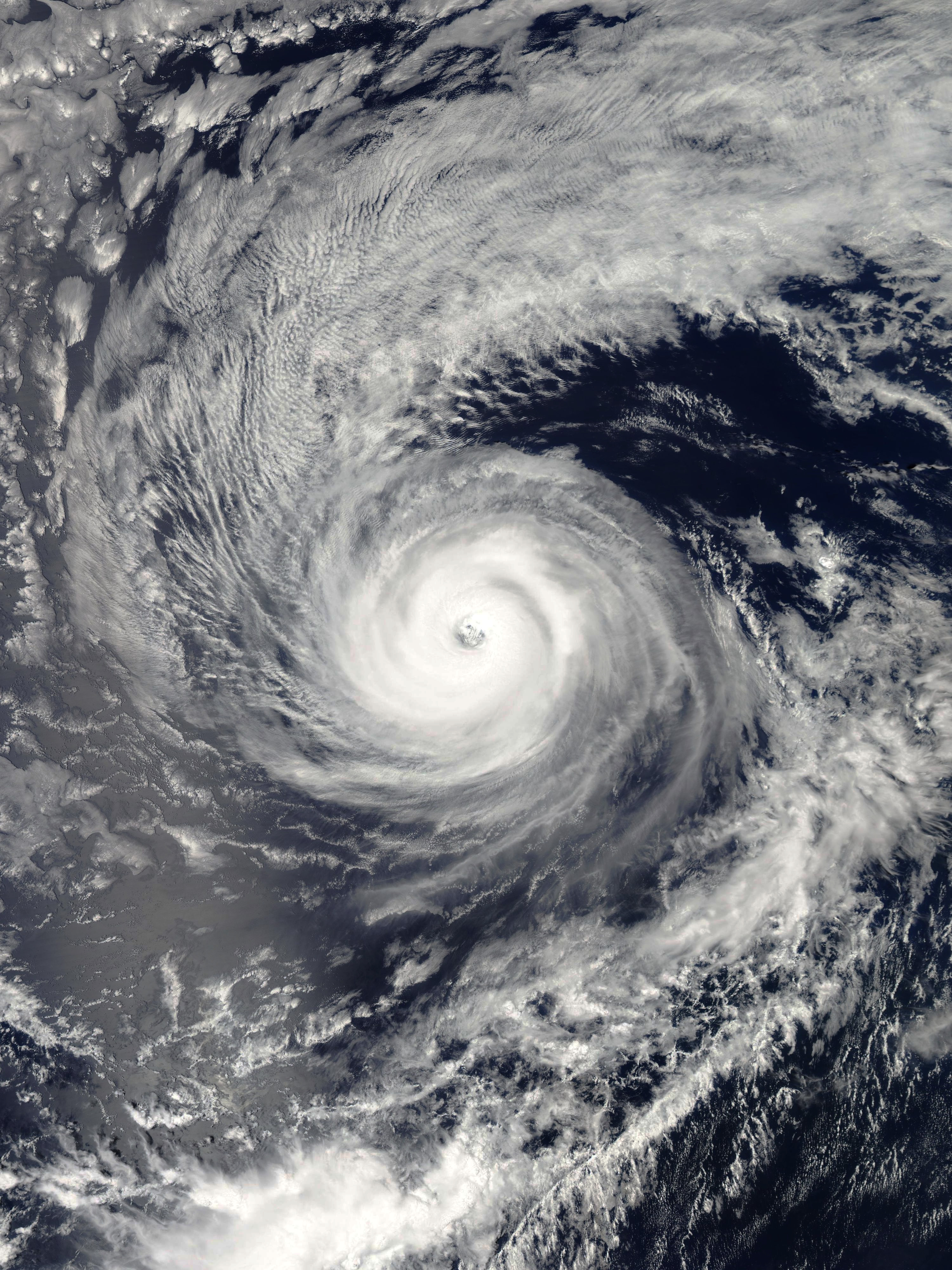
Hurricane Olivia as a high-end Category 3 hurricane on September 6

- 00:00 UTC (5:00 p.m. PDT, September 4) at 16.8°N 119.6°W – Hurricane Olivia reaches its initial peak intensity with winds of 125 mph (205 km/h) and a pressure of 954 mbar (hPa; 28.17 inHg) approximately 335 mi (540 km) west-southwest of Clarion Island.
- 12:00 UTC (2:00 a.m. HST) at 19.5°N 147.2°W – Hurricane Norman strengthens into a Category 3 hurricane approximately 515 miles (830 km) east of Hilo, Hawaii.
- 12:00 UTC (5:00 a.m. PDT) at 17.0°N 121.8°W – Increasing wind shear causes Hurricane Olivia to weaken into a Category 2 hurricane approximately 470 mi (760 km) west-southwest of Clarion Island.

September 6

- 12:00 UTC (5:00 a.m. PDT) at 18.1°N 126.6°W – Hurricane Olivia unexpectedly re-intensifies into a Category 3 hurricane approximately 780 mi (1,255 km) west of Clarion Island.
- 18:00 UTC (8:00 a.m. HST) at 21.0°N 150.6°W – Hurricane Norman weakens into a Category 2 hurricane approximately 305 miles (490 km) east-northeast of Hilo, Hawaii.

September 7

- 00:00 UTC (5:00 p.m. PDT, September 6) at 18.9°N 129.2°W – Hurricane Olivia further intensifies into a Category 4 hurricane and reaches its peak intensity with winds of 130 mph (215 km/h) and a minimum pressure of 951 mbar (hPa; 28.08 inHg) about 950 mi (1,525 km) west of Clarion Island.
- 06:00 UTC (8:00 p.m. HST, September 6) at 22.1°N 151.6°W – Hurricane Norman degenerates into a Category 1 hurricane approximately 280 miles (450 km) northeast of Hilo, Hawaii.
- 06:00 UTC (11:00 p.m. PDT, September 6) at 19.4°N 130.5°W – Hurricane Olivia weakens into a Category 3 hurricane about 1,035 mi (1,665 km) west-northwest of Clarion Island.
- 12:00 UTC (5:00 a.m. PDT) at 19.9°N 131.8°W – Hurricane Olivia further degenerates into a Category 2 hurricane approximately 1,120 mi (1,800 km) west-northwest of Clarion Island.
- 18:00 UTC (8:00 a.m. HST) at 23.7°N 152.6°W – Hurricane Norman weakens into a tropical storm approximately 320 miles (515 km) northeast of Hilo, Hawaii.

September 8

- 06:00 UTC (11:00 p.m. PDT, September 7) at 21.1°N 135.9°W – Hurricane Olivia degenerates into a Category 1 hurricane about 1,250 mi (2,010 km) east-northeast of Hilo, Hawaii.
- 06:00 UTC (12:00 a.m. MDT) at 15.5°N 114.5°W – Tropical Depression Eighteen-E develops from an area of low pressure about 680 mi (1,095 km) south-southwest of the southern tip of Baja California Sur.

September 9

- 00:00 UTC (2:00 p.m. HST, September 8) at 27.1°N 154.1°W – Tropical Storm Norman transitions to an extratropical cyclone approximately 515 miles (830 km) north of Hilo, Hawaii.
- 00:00 UTC (2:00 p.m. HST, September 8) at 21.8°N 140.2°W – Hurricane Olivia enters the Central Pacific Hurricane Center's area of responsibility.
- 00:00 UTC (5:00 p.m. PDT, September 8) at 16.0°N 117.0°W – Tropical Depression Eighteen-E strengthens into Tropical Storm Paul roughly 220 mi (355 km) southwest of Clairon Island.
- 18:00 UTC (11:00 a.m. PDT) at 18.1°N 118.6°W – Tropical Storm Paul achieves its peak intensity with winds of 45 mph (75 km/h) and a pressure of 1002 mbar (29.59 inHg) about 250 mi (400 km) west of Clairon Island.

September 10

- 12:00 UTC (2:00 a.m. HST) – Norman dissipates over 860 miles (1,385 km) north-northeast of Hilo, Hawaii.

September 11

- 06:00 UTC (8:00 p.m. HST, September 10) at 21.9°N 149.8°W – Hurricane Olivia weakens into a tropical storm approximately 375 mi (605 km) northeast of Hilo, Hawaii.
- 06:00 UTC (11:00 a.m. PDT, September 10) at 21.8°N 122.6°W – Tropical Storm Paul degenerates into a tropical depression about 560 mi (900 km) northwest of Clairon Island.

September 12

Animated infrared satellite imagery of Tropical Storm Olivia making landfalls on Maui and Lanai, Hawaii, on September 12

- 00:00 UTC (5:00 p.m. PDT, September 11) at 22.3°N 126.0°W – Tropical Depression Paul degenerates into a remnant low approximately 780 mi (1,255 km) west-northwest of Clairon Island.
- 19:10 UTC (9:10 a.m. HST) at 21.0°N 156.6°W – Tropical Storm Olivia makes landfall on the Hawaiian island of Maui, just northwest of Kahului, with winds of 45 mph (75 km/h). This marks the first known instance of a tropical cyclone making landfall on the island.
- 19:54 UTC (9:54 a.m. HST) at 20.9°N 157.0°W – After crossing the ʻAuʻau Channel, Tropical Storm Olivia makes a second landfall just northwest of Lanai City, Lanai with winds of 45 mph (75 km/h). This is also marks the first time a tropical cyclone made landfall on the island.

September 13

- 06:00 UTC (8:00 p.m. HST, September 12) at 20.1°N 159.8°W – Tropical Storm Olivia weakens into a tropical depression about 150 mi (240 km) southwest of Honolulu, Hawaii.
- 18:00 UTC (8:00 a.m. HST) at 19.0°N 162.5°W – Tropical Depression Olivia briefly reorganizes into a tropical storm about 340 mi (550 km) southwest of Honolulu, Hawaii.

September 14

- 06:00 UTC (8:00 p.m. HST, September 13) at 18.9°N 164.9°W – Tropical Storm Olivia degenerates into a remnant low about 485 mi (785 km) southwest of Honolulu, Hawaii.

September 19

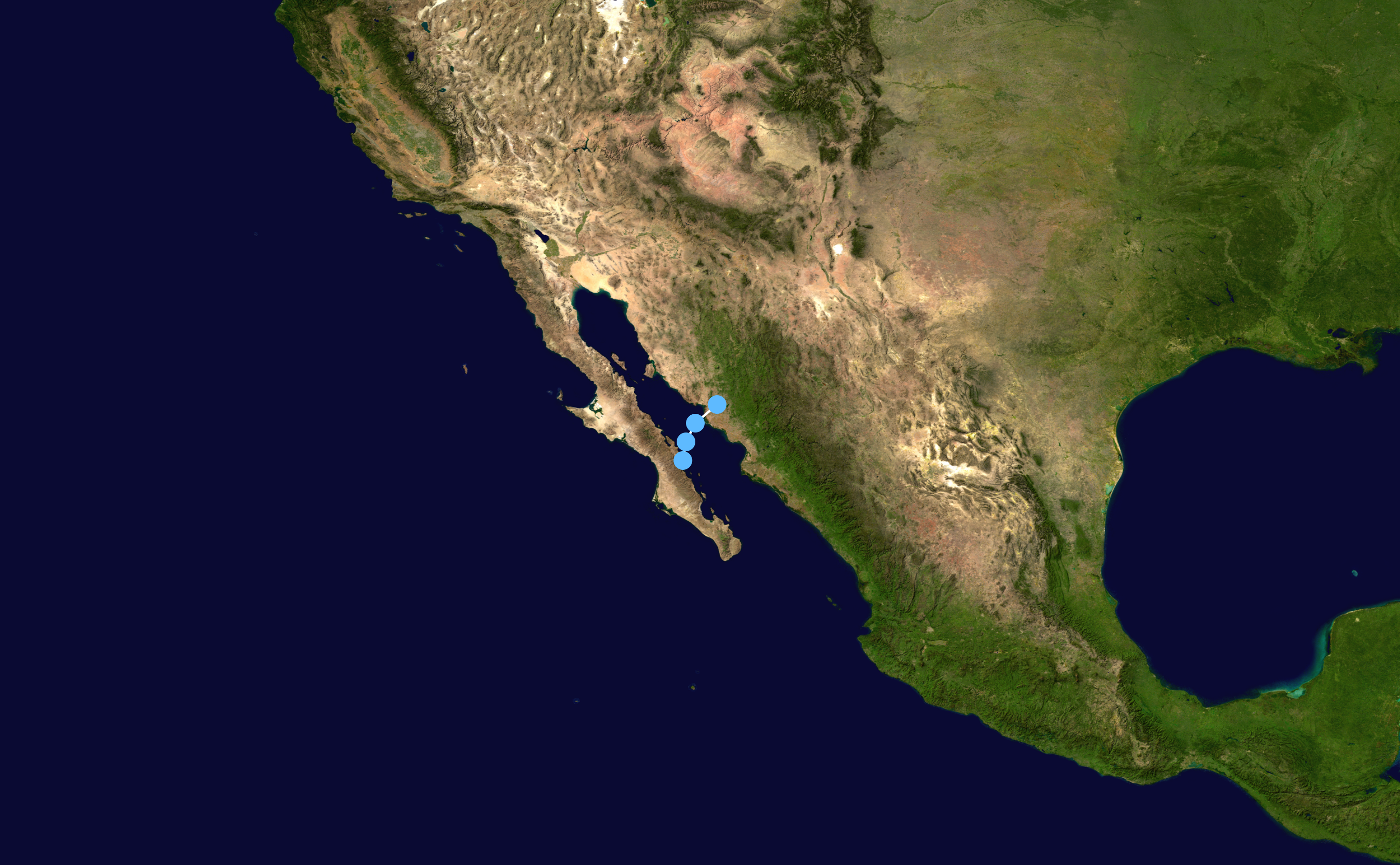
Path of Tropical Depression Nineteen-E across the Gulf of California from September 19–20

- 12:00 UTC (6:00 a.m. MDT) at 26.1°N 111.3°W – Tropical Depression Nineteen-E develops from an elongated trough just east of Loreto, Baja California Sur over the Gulf of California. This marks the first known instance of a tropical cyclone forming within the Gulf of California since the National Hurricane Center's records began in 1949.

September 20

- 00:00 UTC (8:00 p.m. MDT, September 19) at 27.3°N 110.9°W – Tropical Depression Nineteen-E reaches its peak intensity with winds of 35 mph (55 km/h) and a minimum pressure of 1002 mbar (29.6 inHg) about 60 mi (95 km) west-southwest of Ciudad Obregón. The National Hurricane Center noted in its final report that the system may have briefly become a tropical storm before landfall but data were inconclusive.
- 03:00 UTC (11:00 p.m. MDT, September 19) at 27.6°N 110.6°W – Tropical Depression Nineteen-E makes landfall at peak strength between Ciudad Obregón and Guaymas.
- 06:00 UTC (2:00 a.m. MDT) – Tropical Depression Nineteen-E rapidly dissipates over mountainous terrain about 50 mi (80 km) east of Guaymas.

September 25

- 06:00 UTC (12:00 a.m. MDT) at 14.4°N 106.9°W – Tropical Depression Twenty-E forms from a tropical wave while located roughly 405 mi (650 km) south-southwest of Manzanillo, Mexico.
- 12:00 UTC (6:00 a.m. MDT) at 14.6°N 107.7°W – Tropical Depression Twenty-E strengthens into Tropical Storm Rosa while 385 mi (620 km) south-southwest of Manzanillo, Mexico.

September 26

- 12:00 UTC (6:00 a.m. MDT) at 16.0°N 110.8°W – Tropical Storm Rosa strengthens into a Category 1 hurricane while 480 mi (770 km) southwest of Manzanillo, Mexico.

September 27

- 12:00 UTC (6:00 a.m. MDT) at 17.0°N 114.6°W – Hurricane Rosa strengthens into a Category 2 hurricane while 690 mi (1,110 km) southwest of Manzanillo, Mexico.
- 18:00 UTC (11:00 a.m. PDT) at 17.0°N 115.5°W – Hurricane Rosa strengthens into a Category 3 hurricane while 885 mi (1,425 km) south of Punta San Antonio, Mexico.

September 28

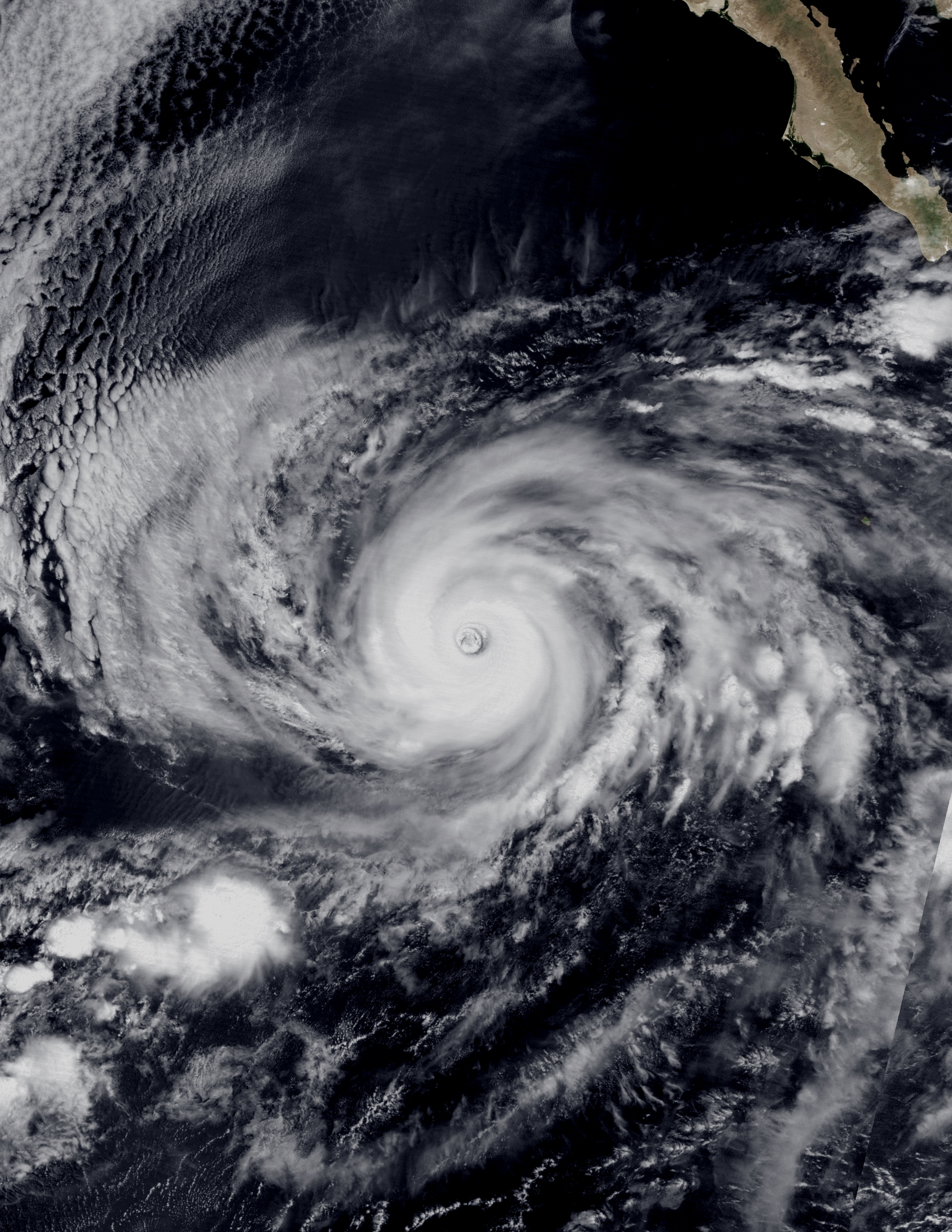
Hurricane Rosa as a Category 4 hurricane on September 28

- 00:00 UTC (5:00 p.m. PDT, September 27) at 16.9°N 116.4°W – Hurricane Rosa strengthens into a Category 4 hurricane while 890 mi (1,430 km) south of Punta San Antonio, Mexico.
- 06:00 UTC (11:00 p.m. PDT, September 27) at 16.9°N 117.1°W – Hurricane Rosa peaks with winds of 150 mph (240 km/h) and a minimum pressure of 936 mbar (27.6 inHg), while 895 mi (1,440 km) south-southwest of Punta San Antonio, Mexico.
- 18:00 UTC (11:00 a.m. PDT) at 17.4°N 117.8°W – Hurricane Rosa weakens into a Category 3 hurricane while 865 mi (1,390 km) south-southwest of Punta San Antonio, Mexico.

September 29

- 00:00 UTC (5:00 p.m. PDT, September 28) at 17.9°N 118.0°W – Hurricane Rosa degenerates into a Category 2 hurricane while 835 mi (1,345 km) south-southwest of Punta San Antonio, Mexico.
- 12:00 UTC (7:00 a.m. CDT) at 12.0°N 101.3°W – Tropical Storm Sergio forms about 385 mi (620 km) south of Zihuatanejo, Mexico.
- 12:00 UTC (2:00 a.m. HST) at 11.7°N 157.1°W – A tropical depression develops approximately 505 mi (815 km) south-southwest of Ka Lae, Hawaii. (Note: Operationally, the depression that became Hurricane Walaka was not warned upon until 21:00 UTC (11 a.m. HST) by which time it was already a tropical storm. It would have received the designation "One-C" prior to being named.)
- 18:00 UTC (8:00 a.m. HST) at 11.6°N 158.6°W – The tropical depression intensifies into Tropical Storm Walaka about 540 mi (870 km) south-southwest of Ka Lae, Hawaii.

September 30

- 06:00 UTC (11:00 p.m. PDT, September 29) at 22.8°N 118.9°W – Hurricane Rosa weakens into a Category 1 hurricane while 520 mi (835 km) southwest of Punta San Antonio, Mexico.
- 18:00 UTC (8:00 a.m. HST) at 11.6°N 164.5°W – Tropical Storm Walaka strengthens into a Category 1 hurricane about 800 mi (1,285 km) south-southwest of Honolulu, Hawaii.

=== October ===
October 1

- 00:00 UTC (5:00 p.m. PDT, September 30) at 25.6°N 117.9°W – Hurricane Rosa weakens into a tropical storm while 320 mi (515 km) southwest of Punta San Antonio, Mexico.
- 06:00 UTC (8:00 p.m. HST, September 30) at 11.8°N 167.1°W – Hurricane Walaka rapidly intensifies into a Category 2 hurricane about 895 mi (1,440 km) southwest of Honolulu, Hawaii.
- 12:00 UTC (2:00 a.m. HST) at 12.0°N 168.0°W – Hurricane Walaka rapidly intensifies into a Category 3 hurricane about 925 mi (1,490 km) southwest of Honolulu, Hawaii.
- 18:00 UTC (8:00 a.m. HST) at 12.5°N 168.8°W – Hurricane Walaka rapidly intensifies into a Category 4 hurricane about 885 mi (1,425 km) southwest of Kauai, Hawaii.

October 2

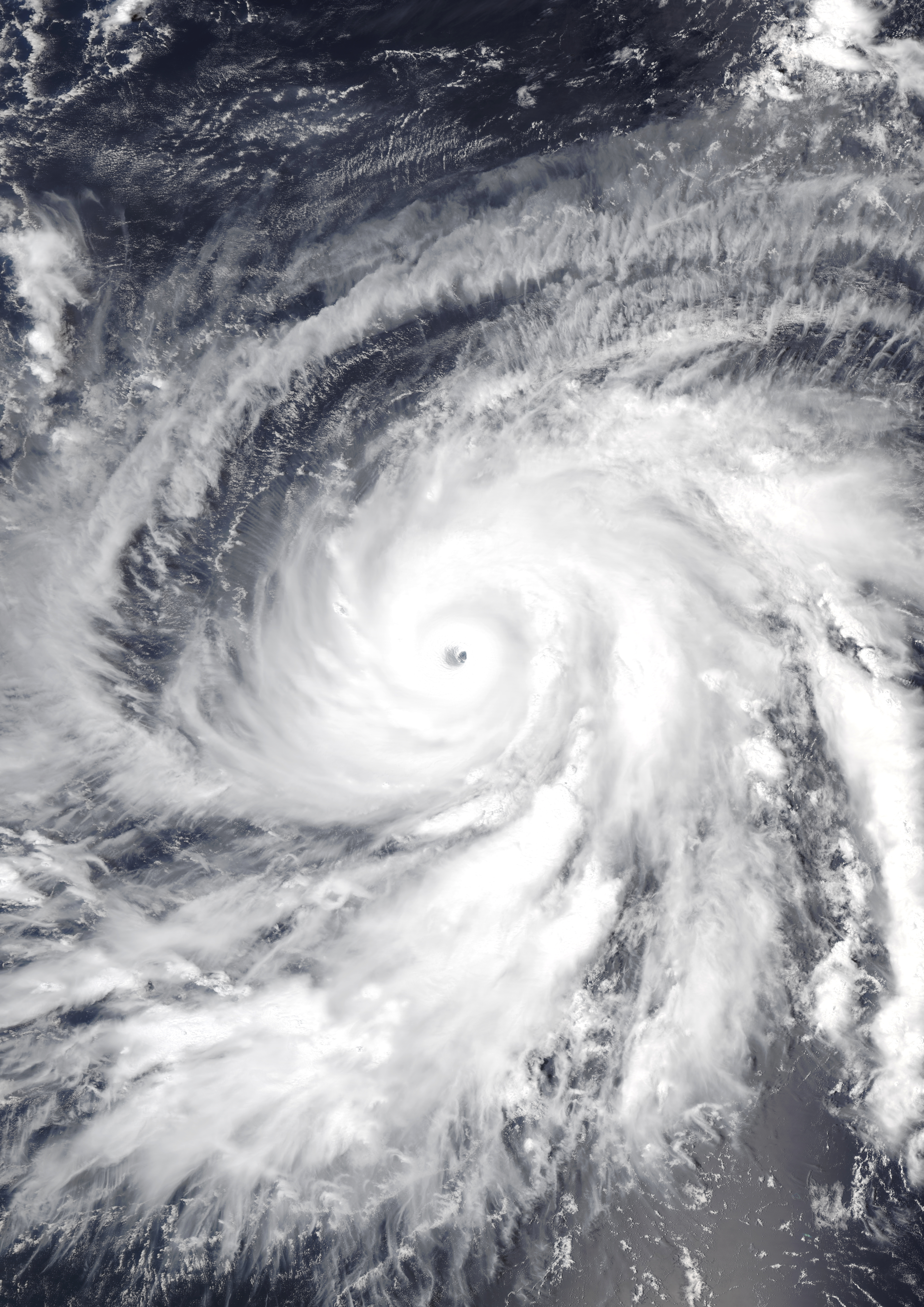
Hurricane Walaka at Category 5 intensity while southwest of the Hawaiian Islands

- 00:00 UTC (5:00 p.m. PDT, October 1) at 28.3°N 115.7°W – Tropical Storm Rosa weakens into a tropical depression while 105 mi (170 km) south of Punta San Antonio, Mexico.
- 00:00 UTC (6:00 p.m. MDT, October 1) at 10.9°N 111.5°W – Tropical Storm Sergio strengthens into a Category 1 hurricane about 810 mi (1,305 km) west-southwest of Zihuatanejo, Mexico.
- 00:00 UTC (2:00 p.m. HST, October 1) at 12.9°N 169.6°W – Hurricane Walaka's rapid intensification culminates with it becoming a Category 5 hurricane about 905 mi (1,455 km) southwest of Kauai, Hawaii. Concurrently, it reaches its peak intensity with maximum winds of 160 mph (260 km/h) and a minimum pressure of 921 mbar (hPa; 27.20 inHg).
- 11:00 UTC (5:00 a.m. MDT) at 29.2°N 114.6°W – Tropical Depression Rosa makes landfall 70 mi (115 km) southeast of Punta San Antonio, Mexico.
- 12:00 UTC (6:00 a.m. MDT) at 10.8°N 113.5°W – Hurricane Sergio strengthens into a Category 2 hurricane about 925 mi (1,490 km) west-southwest of Zihuatanejo, Mexico.
- 12:00 UTC (2:00 a.m. HST) at 14.2°N 170.0°W – Hurricane Walaka weakens into a Category 4 hurricane about 880 mi (1,415 km) southwest of Kauai, Hawaii.
- 18:00 UTC (12:00 p.m. MDT) – Tropical Depression Rosa dissipates over the Baja California peninsula.
- 18:00 UTC (12:00 p.m. MDT) at 11.1°N 114.5°W – Hurricane Sergio strengthens into a Category 3 hurricane about 970 mi (1,560 km) west-southwest of Zihuatanejo, Mexico.

October 4

- 00:00 UTC (5:00 p.m. PDT, October 3) at 13.5°N 118.0°W – Hurricane Sergio strengthens into a Category 4 hurricane about 1,125 mi (1,810 km) west-southwest of Zihuatanejo, Mexico.
- 06:00 UTC (11:00 p.m. PDT, October 3) at 13.5°N 118.0°W – Hurricane Sergio peaks with winds of 140 mph (220 km/h) and a minimum pressure of 942 mbar (27.8 inHg), about 825 mi (1,330 km) southwest of Cabo San Lucas, Mexico.
- 06:00 UTC (8:00 p.m. HST, October 3) at 24.0°N 166.9°W – Hurricane Walaka weakens into a Category 3 hurricane about 490 mi (790 km) west-northwest of Kauai, Hawaii.
- 06:20 UTC (8:20 p.m. HST, October 3) at 24.1°N 166.8°W – Hurricane Walaka passes roughly 35 mi (55 km) west-northwest of the French Frigate Shoals as a high-end Category 3 hurricane.
- 18:00 UTC (8:00 a.m. HST) at 28.0°N 166.3°W – Hurricane Walaka degenerates into a Category 2 hurricane about 590 mi (950 km) northwest of Kauai, Hawaii.

October 5

- 00:00 UTC (5:00 p.m. PDT, October 4) at 15.7°N 120.2°W – Hurricane Sergio weakens into a Category 3 hurricane about 835 mi (1,345 km) southwest of Cabo San Lucas, Mexico.
- 00:00 UTC (2:00 p.m. HST, October 4) at 29.7°N 167.5°W – Hurricane Walaka degenerates into a Category 1 hurricane about 720 mi (1,160 km) northwest of Kauai, Hawaii.
- 06:00 UTC (8:00 p.m. HST, October 4) at 30.5°N 168.3°W – Hurricane Walaka weakens into a tropical storm about 795 mi (1,280 km) northwest of Kauai, Hawaii.

October 6

- 12:00 UTC (2:00 a.m. HST) at 35.1°N 164.5°W – Tropical Storm Walaka transitions to an extratropical cyclone about 945 mi (1,520 km) north-northwest of Kauai, Hawaii.

October 7

- 12:00 UTC (5:00 a.m. PDT) at 14.5°N 126.5°W – Hurricane Sergio degenerates into a Category 2 hurricane about 1,230 mi (1,980 km) southwest of Cabo San Lucas, Mexico.
- 18:00 UTC (8:00 a.m. HST) – Walaka dissipates over 1,790 mi (2,880 km) north-northeast of Kauai, Hawaii.

October 8

- 00:00 UTC (5:00 p.m. PDT, October 7) at 14.7°N 127.8°W – Hurricane Sergio weakens into a Category 1 hurricane about 1,300 mi (2,090 km) west-southwest of Cabo San Lucas, Mexico.

October 9

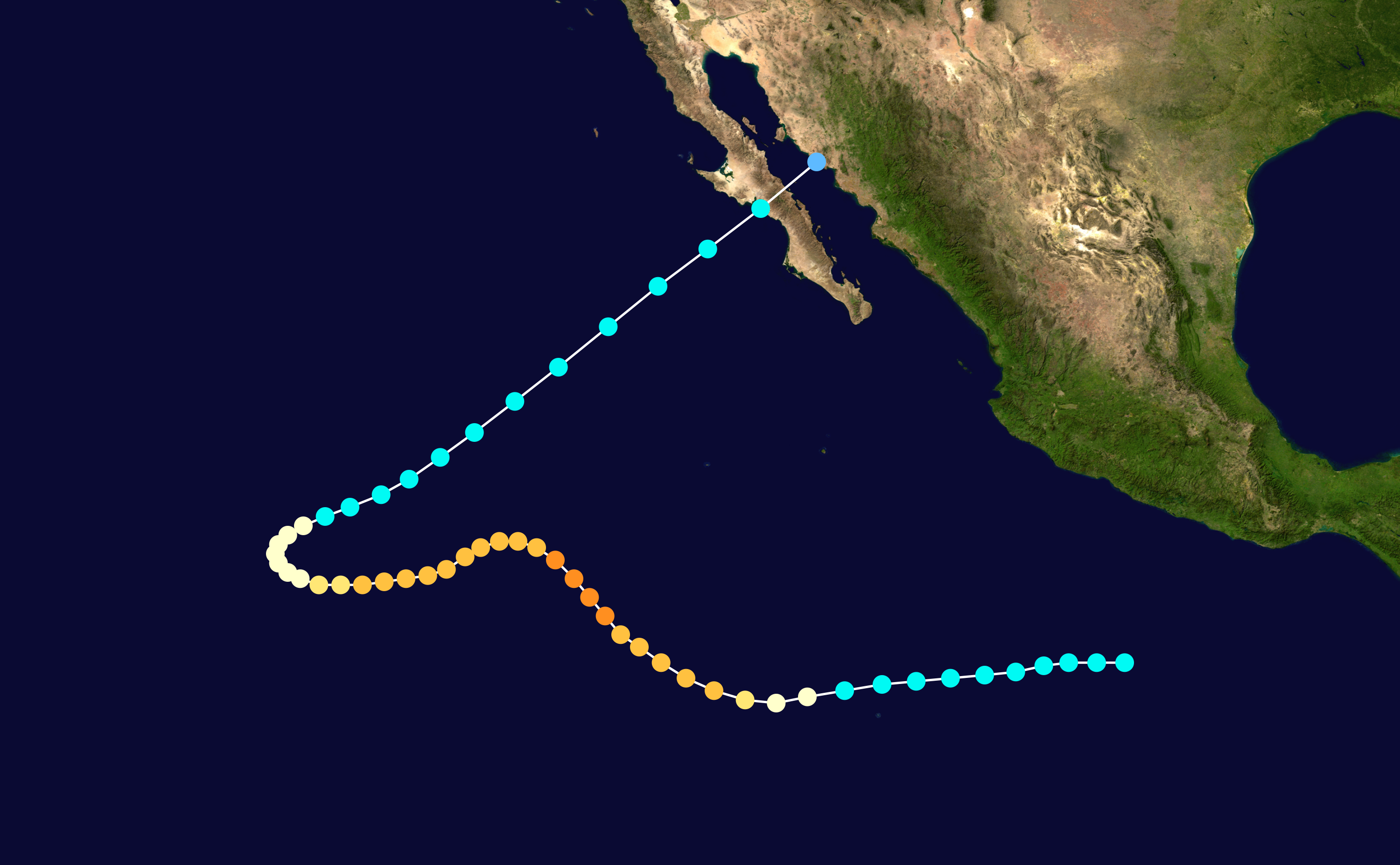
Path of Hurricane Sergio across the Eastern Pacific Ocean from September 29 – October 12

- 18:00 UTC (11:00 a.m. PDT) at 16.7°N 127.0°W – Hurricane Sergio degenerates into a tropical storm about 1,190 mi (1,915 km) west-southwest of Cabo San Lucas, Mexico.

October 12

- 12:00 UTC (6:00 a.m. MDT) at 26.6°N 113.0°W – Tropical Storm Sergio makes landfall near Los Castros, Baja California Sur.
- 18:00 UTC (12:00 p.m. MDT) at 28.1°N 111.2°W – Tropical Storm Sergio weakens into a tropical depression about 25 mi (40 km) west-northwest of Guaymas, Mexico.
- 18:00 UTC (12:00 p.m. MDT) at 28.1°N 111.2°W – Tropical Depression Sergio makes landfall about 25 mi (40 km) west-northwest of Guaymas, Mexico.

October 13

- 00:00 UTC (6:00 p.m. MDT, October 12) – Tropical Depression Sergio dissipates inland over Mexico.

October 14

- 12:00 UTC (7:00 a.m. CDT) at 17.0°N 102.8°W – Tropical Depression Twenty-Two-E forms while located roughly 75 mi (120 km) south-southwest of Lázaro Cárdenas, Michoacán.

October 15

- 06:00 UTC (1:00 a.m. CDT) at 17.6°N 104.1°W – Tropical Depression Twenty-Two-E intensifies into Tropical Storm Tara while located roughly 65 mi (105 km) southwest of Punta San Telmo, Michoacán.

October 16

- 00:00 UTC (7:00 p.m. CDT, October 15) at 18.4°N 104.3°W – Tropical Storm Tara reaches peak intensity with maximum sustained winds of 65 mph (100 km/h) and a minimum pressure of 995 mbar (29.4 inHg) while located roughly 45 mi (70 km) south of Manzanillo, Colima.
- 18:00 UTC (1:00 p.m. CDT) – Tropical Storm Tara dissipates roughly 40 mi (65 km) west-southwest of Manzanillo, Colima.

October 19

- 06:00 UTC (1:00 a.m. CDT) at 13.1°N 91.7°W – Tropical Depression Twenty-Three-E forms while located roughly 90 mi (145 km) west-southwest of Puerto San José, Guatemala.
- 18:00 UTC (1:00 p.m. CDT) at 13.3°N 92.0°W – Tropical Depression Twenty-Three-E intensifies into Tropical Storm Vicente while around 85 mi (135 km) west-southwest of Puerto San José, Guatemala.

October 20

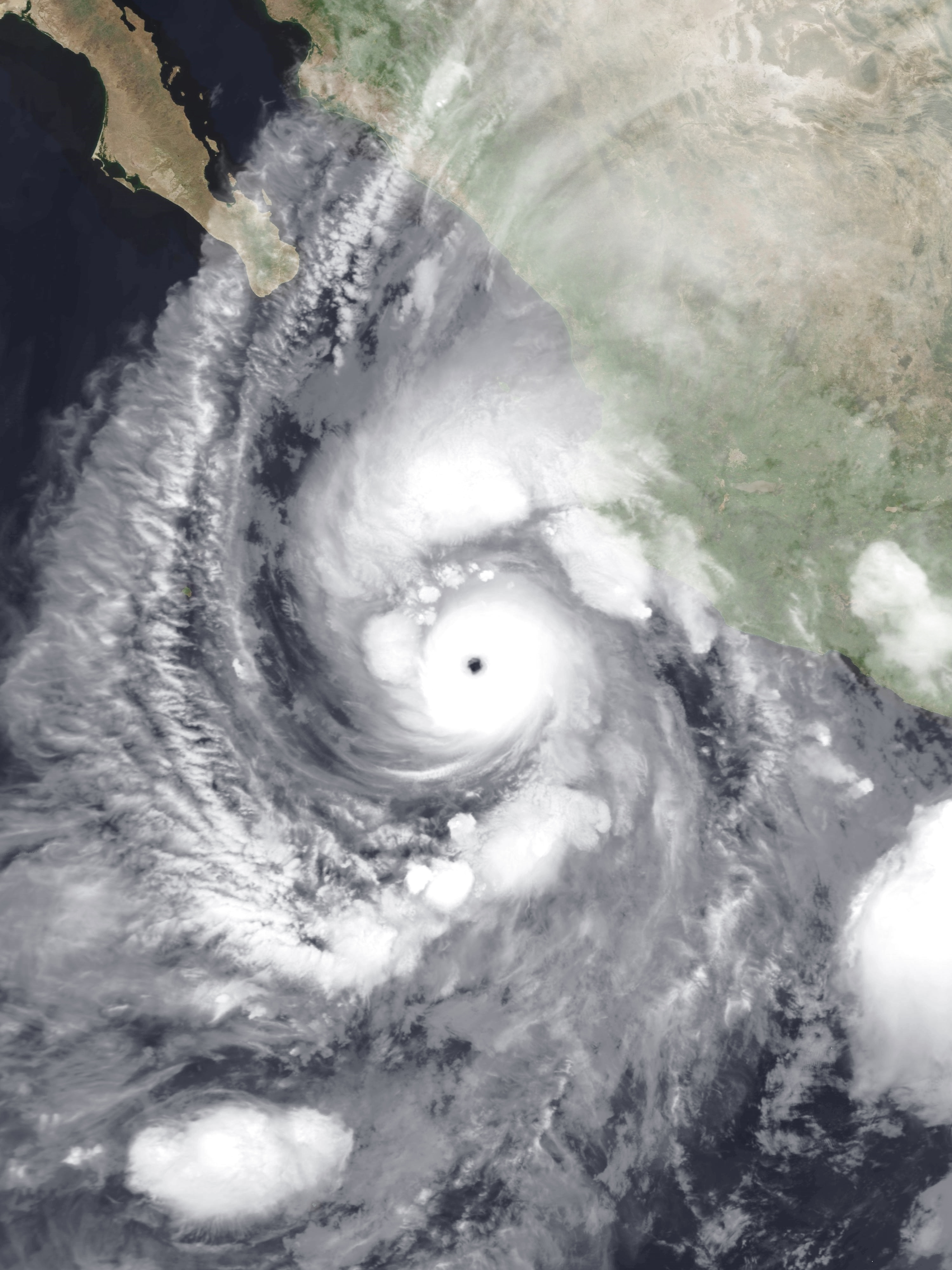
Hurricane Willa at its peak intensity on October 22 just southwest of Mexico

- 00:00 UTC (7:00 p.m. CDT, October 19) at 14.8°N 103.6°W – Tropical Depression Twenty-Four-E develops from a broad area of low pressure about roughly 265 mi (425 km) south of Manzanillo, Colima.
- 12:00 UTC (7:00 a.m. CDT) at 14.9°N 105.1°W – Tropical Depression Twenty-Four-E intensifies into Tropical Storm Willa about 290 mi (465 km) south of Manzanillo, Colima.
- 18:00 UTC (1:00 p.m. CDT) at 14.5°N 94.0°W – Tropical Storm Vicente peaks with winds of 50 mph (85 km/h) and a pressure of 1,002 mbar (29.6 inHg), while around 85 mi (135 km) southeast of Puerto Escondido, Mexico.

October 21

- 06:00 UTC (12:00 a.m. MDT) at 16.0°N 106.3°W – Tropical Storm Willa rapidly intensifies into a Category 1 hurricane roughly 245 mi (395 km) south-southwest of Manzanillo, Colima.
- 12:00 UTC (6:00 a.m. MDT) at 16.4°N 106.6°W – Hurricane Willa rapidly intensifies into a Category 2 hurricane roughly 235 mi (380 km) southwest of Manzanillo, Colima.
- 18:00 UTC (12:00 p.m. MDT) at 16.8°N 106.9°W – Hurricane Willa rapidly intensifies into a Category 3 hurricane roughly 230 mi (370 km) southwest of Manzanillo, Colima.

October 22

- 00:00 UTC (6:00 p.m. MDT, October 21) at 17.5°N 107.1°W – Hurricane Willa rapidly intensifies into a Category 4 hurricane roughly 210 mi (340 km) southwest of Manzanillo, Colima.
- 06:00 UTC (12:00 a.m. MDT) at 17.9°N 107.1°W – Hurricane Willa's rapid intensification culminates with it becoming a Category 5 hurricane roughly 200 mi (320 km) west-southwest of Manzanillo, Colima. It reaches its peak intensity at this time with winds of 160 mph (260 km/h) and a minimum pressure of 925 mbar (27.32 inHg). This marks the third time a Pacific hurricane season featured three Category 5 hurricanes since reliable records began, tying the record set in 1994 and 2002.
- 12:00 UTC (6:00 a.m. MDT) at 18.7°N 107.2°W – Hurricane Willa weakens into a Category 4 hurricane approximately 185 mi (300 km) southwest of Puerto Vallarta, Jalisco.

October 23

- 06:00 UTC (12:00 a.m. MDT) at 20.6°N 107.2°W – Hurricane Willa weakens into a Category 3 hurricane roughly 130 mi (210 km) west of Puerto Vallarta, Jalisco.
- 06:00 UTC (1:00 a.m. CDT) at 16.8°N 101.7°W – Tropical Storm Vicente weakens into a tropical depression around 95 mi (155 km) southwest of Playa Azul, Mexico.
- 13:30 UTC (7:30 a.m. CDT) at 18.0°N 102.4°W – Tropical Depression Vicente makes landfall near Playa Azul, Mexico.
- 17:45 UTC (11:45 a.m. MDT) – Hurricane Willa passes over the Islas Marías archipelago with maximum winds of 115 mph (185 km/h); its eyewall traverses the islands of San Juanito and María Madre.
- 18:00 UTC (1:00 p.m. CDT) – Tropical Depression Vicente dissipates inland over Mexico.

October 24

- 01:20 UTC (8:20 p.m. CDT, October 23) at 22.7°N 105.8°W – Hurricane Willa makes landfall with winds of 115 mph (185 km/h) and a pressure of 968 mbar (28.59 inHg) near Palmito del Verde, Sinaloa.
- 06:00 UTC (1:00 a.m. CDT) at 23.8°N 104.6°W – Hurricane Willa rapidly degenerates into a tropical storm, due to a combination of mountainous terrain and strong wind shear while located about 10 mi (15 km) southeast of Durango City, Durango.
- 12:00 UTC (7:00 a.m. CDT) – Tropical Storm Willa dissipates over northeastern Mexico.

=== November ===
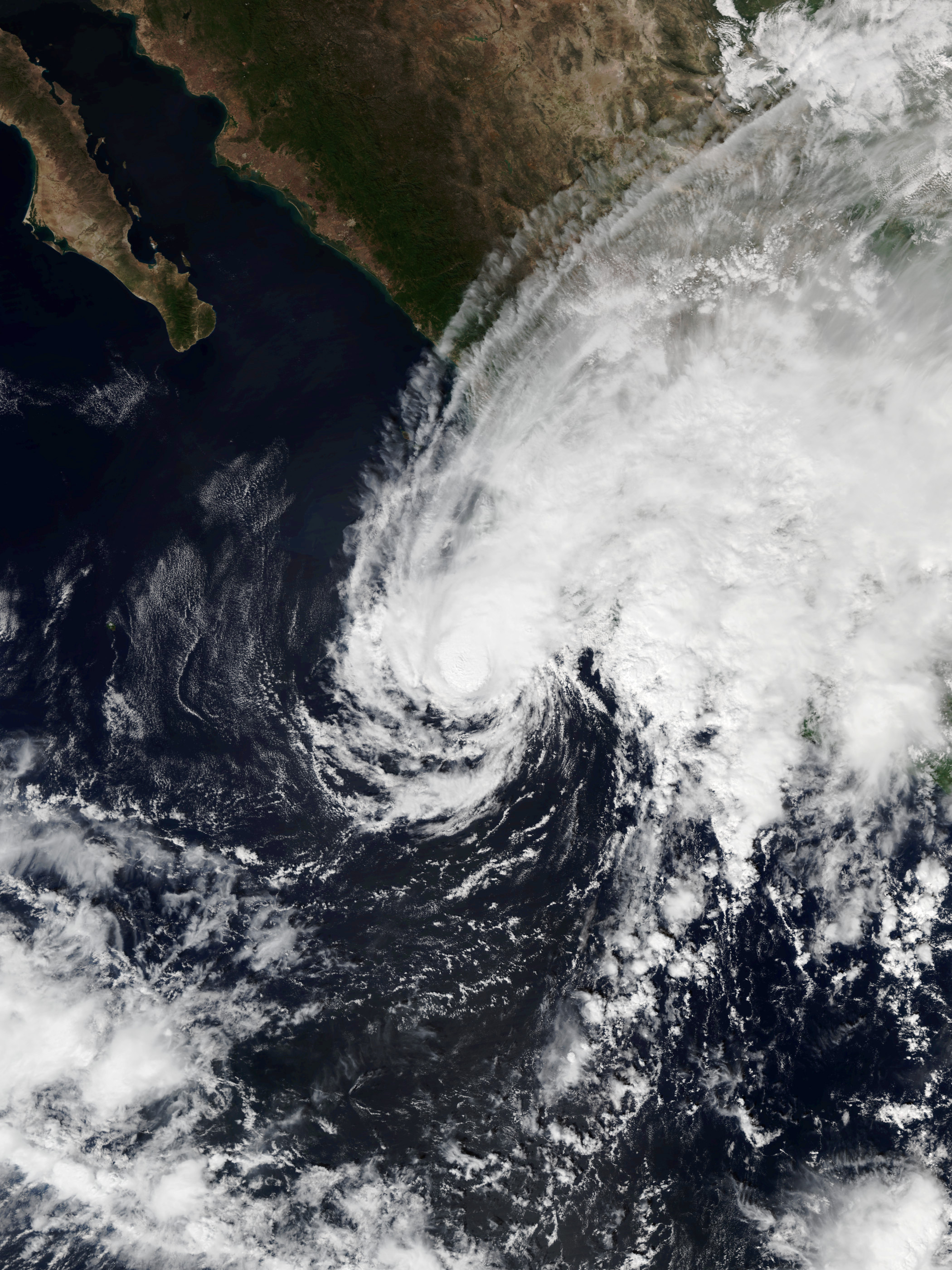
Tropical Storm Xavier at its peak intensity near western Mexico on November 4

November 2

- 12:00 UTC (6:00 a.m. MDT) at 14.2°N 109.9°W – Tropical Depression Twenty-Five-E forms from an area of low pressure about 520 mi (835 km) southwest of Manzanillo, Colima.

November 3

- 00:00 UTC (6:00 p.m. MDT, November 2) at 14.4°N 108.5°W – Tropical Depression Twenty-Five-E strengthens into Tropical Storm Xavier about 425 mi (685 km) southwest of Manzanillo, Colima.

November 4

- 12:00 UTC (6:00 a.m. CST) (Note: Timezones shifted back one hour to standard time when Daylight saving time ended) at 17.4°N 105.3°W – Tropical Storm Xavier reaches peak intensity with winds of 65 mph (100 km/h) and a minimum pressure of 996 mbar (29.41 inHg), about 130 mi (210 km) southwest of Manzanillo, Colima.

November 6

- 00:00 UTC (5:00 p.m. MST, November 5) at 18.9°N 107.2°W – Tropical Storm Xavier degenerates into a remnant low about 250 mi (400 km) east of Socorro Island.

November 30

- The 2018 Pacific hurricane season officially ends.

== See also ==
- List of Pacific hurricanes
- Pacific hurricane season
- Timeline of the 2018 Atlantic hurricane season
