= List of storms named Ileana =

The name Ileana has been used for six tropical cyclones in the Eastern Pacific Ocean.

- Hurricane Ileana (1994) – a Category 1 hurricane that affected the Baja California Peninsula
- Tropical Storm Ileana (2000) – affected the coast of Mexico
- Hurricane Ileana (2006) – a Category 3 hurricane that briefly threatened Mexico but turned away.
- Hurricane Ileana (2012) – a Category 1 hurricane that did not affect land
- Tropical Storm Ileana (2018) – briefly affected the coast of Mexico, before being absorbed by Hurricane John
- Tropical Storm Ileana (2024) – affected Baja California and Mexico
