= Tropical Storm Ileana (2018) =

Eastern Pacific tropical storm

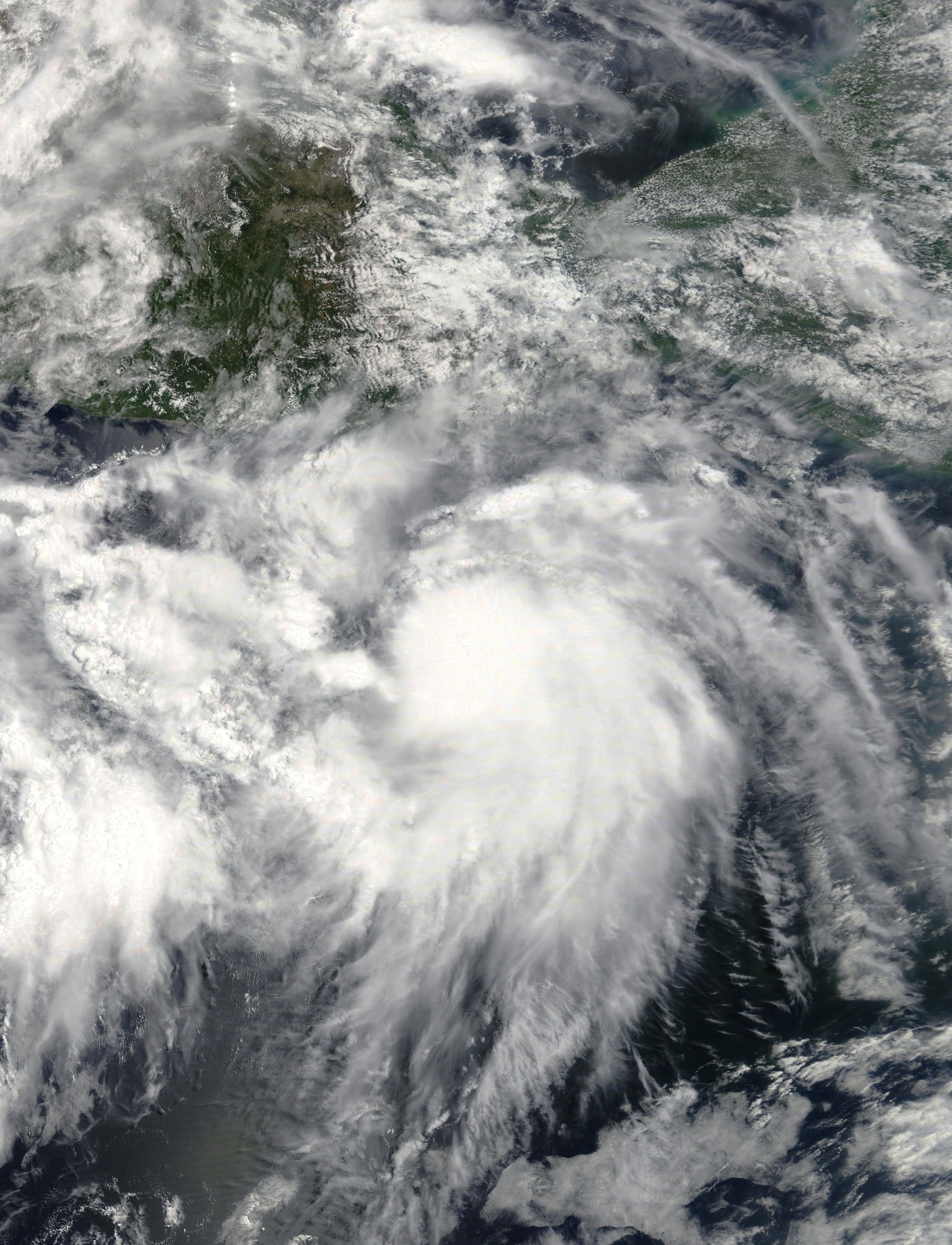
- Tropical Storm Ileana near peak intensity off the western coast of Mexico on August 5

Meteorological history
- Formed: August 4, 2018
- Dissipated: August 7, 2018

Tropical storm
- 1-minute sustained (SSHWS/NWS)
- Highest winds: 65 mph (100 km/h)
- Lowest pressure: 998 mbar (hPa); 29.47 inHg

Overall effects
- Fatalities: 8 total
- Damage: $737,000 (2018 USD)
- Areas affected: Western Mexico
- IBTrACS /
- Part of the 2018 Pacific hurricane season

Tropical Storm Ileana was a small tropical cyclone that affected western Mexico in early August 2018, causing deadly flooding. The eleventh tropical cyclone and ninth named storm of the 2018 Pacific hurricane season, Ileana originated from a tropical wave that the National Hurricane Center began monitoring on July 26 as the wave left the west coast of Africa. The wave traveled across the Atlantic Ocean with no thunderstorm activity, before crossing into the Eastern Pacific Ocean early on August 4. Rapidly developing, the disturbance organized into a tropical depression on the evening of the same day. Initially, the depression was well-defined, but it soon degraded due to northerly wind shear. Despite the unfavorable conditions, the system began to strengthen on August 5, becoming Tropical Storm Ileana. A day later, on August 6, Ileana began to develop an eyewall structure as it reached its peak intensity with winds of 65 mph (100 km/h) and a pressure of 998 mbar (29.47 inHg). The storm gradually became intertwined with the nearby Hurricane John; over the next day, the circulation of John disrupted Ileana before ultimately absorbing it on August 7.

Ileana prompted the issuance of multiple watches and warnings along the coast of Baja California Sur and the Pacific coast of Mexico. The system paralleled the Pacific coast for much of its existence. Ileana caused a total of eight deaths in Mexico; four people were killed in Guerrero and another four died in Chiapas. Flooding also ensued in the states of Oaxaca, Guerrero, and Mexico.

== Meteorological history ==
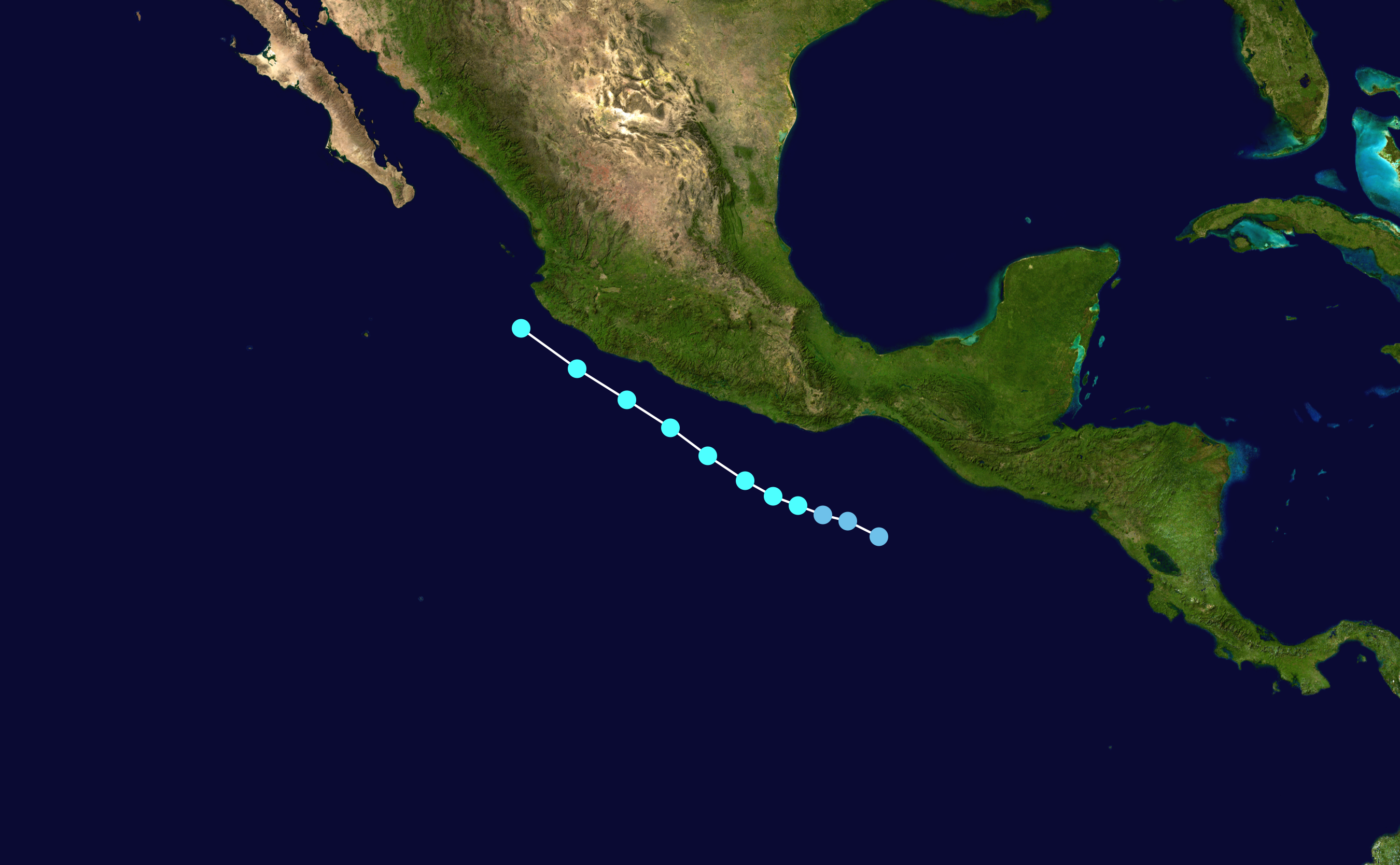
Map plotting the storm's track and intensity, according to the Saffir–Simpson scale Map key Saffir–Simpson scale Tropical depression (≤38 mph, ≤62 km/h) Tropical storm (39–73 mph, 63–118 km/h) Category 1 (74–95 mph, 119–153 km/h) Category 2 (96–110 mph, 154–177 km/h) Category 3 (111–129 mph, 178–208 km/h) Category 4 (130–156 mph, 209–251 km/h) Category 5 (≥157 mph, ≥252 km/h) Unknown Storm type Tropical cyclone Subtropical cyclone Extratropical cyclone, remnant low, tropical disturbance, or monsoon depression

The origins of Ileana can be traced back to a tropical wave that departed from the west coast of Africa on July 26. The wave had virtually no convection as it crossed over the Atlantic. Once the wave entered the Eastern Pacific Ocean early on August 4, thunderstorm and convective activity rapidly increased. The National Hurricane Center (NHC) first noted the potential for development on August 3. After satellite imagery indicated that an area of low pressure had formed a few hundred miles south of the Gulf of Tehuantepec and was showing signs of organization, the NHC raised the system's two-day development chances to 50% around 17:00 UTC on August 4. Only an hour later, at 18:00 UTC, the system was designated as a tropical depression while located about 230 mi (370 km) south-southeast of Puerto Angel, Mexico. Around that time, the depression had a well-defined low-pressure center and a pronounced, arced band of deep convection. Six hours later, the structure of the depression had degraded due to northerly wind shear caused by the stronger disturbance that would later become Hurricane John. The low-level center of the depression had become exposed in the northwest as it moved out from under the edge of the convection; simultaneously, convection decreased in the east and south. The depression was traveling west-northwest under the influence of the aforementioned disturbance, which was located to the west, and a mid-level ridge located to the east. Despite the disruptive wind shear, the depression then began to strengthen, becoming Tropical Storm Ileana on August 5 at 12:00 UTC. At that time, Ileana had a fairly symmetrical structure and a central dense overcast-like feature.

Ileana continued to strengthen over the next day after entering an area with warm sea surface temperatures of 86 to 88 °F (30 to 31 °C). Ileana reached peak intensity on August 6 at 12:00 UTC with maximum sustained winds of 65 mph (100 km/h) and a minimum central pressure of 998 mbar (29.47 inHg), while located approximately 115 mi (185 km) southwest of Acapulco. Around the same time, Ileana had strong deep convection with cloud temperatures of −121 to −130 °F (−85 to −90 °C). Soon after, microwave imagery and Acapulco radar showed the emergence of an eyewall structure at the mid-levels of the system. By 21:00 UTC on August 6, Ileana had become increasingly intertwined in the outer bands of Hurricane John to the west as the two systems began to experience the Fujiwhara effect. The nearby Sierra Madre Mountains further disrupted Ileana's circulation center. The storm was completely absorbed by John at 12:00 UTC on August 7, just west of Cabo Corrientes.

== Preparations and impact ==
As a precautionary measure, the Government of Mexico issued a tropical storm watch for the country's Pacific coast from Lázaro Cárdenas, Michoacán, to Cabo Corrientes, Jalisco, on August 5 at 22:40 UTC. The watch was upgraded to a tropical storm warning at 03:00 UTC on August 6. Six hours later, the Government of Mexico issued a hurricane watch for Punta San Telmo, Michoacán, to Playa Perula, Jalisco, and a tropical storm watch for the southern tip of Baja California Sur from Los Barrilles to Todos Santos. All watches and warnings were gradually discontinued after Ileana's strongest winds were forecast to remain offshore. Overall, a green alert was issued for Mexico, signifying a low level of danger. Heavy rainfall in association with Ileana prompted the issuance of orange alerts in Álvaro Obregón and Magdalena Contreras as well as yellow alerts for the rest of Mexico City.

In the state of Guerrero, Ileana caused a total of four deaths. On August 5, the body of 35-year-old man was discovered in the Huacapa River in Chilpancingo. The man had reportedly been pushing a car out of a ravine when a strong current pulled him down to the river where he drowned. A fishing boat capsized in Acapulco, causing an 8-year-old and a 15-year-old to fall into the Laguna and drown. The storm caused power outages in multiple Acapulcan neighborhoods and left flooding there. A rainfall total of 3.54 in (90 mm) was recorded at the Acapulco International Airport. Rip currents along the coast at Acapulco resulted in the death of a tourist at La Condesa beach. He was rescued by lifeguards, but later died despite receiving medical treatment. In the nearby municipality of Coyuca de Benítez, at least 20 homes were inundated and numerous streets were flooded. In the municipality of Santiago Choapam in Oaxaca, heavy rains from Ileana caused a landslide that left a house in ruins. All inhabitants of the structure were unharmed. A peak rainfall total of 7.71 in (196 mm) was observed in Jacatepec, Oaxaca. In Jiquipilas, Chiapas, Ileana caused another four deaths on August 6. A vehicle containing 18 individuals was swept away by water currents while attempting to cross a flooded bridge; three children and one adult were later found dead. The state of Michoacán required MX$13.6 million (US$737,000) to repair damage to roads and houses in 15 neighborhoods.

In the state of Mexico, heavy rains from Ileana caused severe flooding; in the municipality of Huixquilucan, two homes were flooded and a sewage canal overflowed. The Anillo Periférico, Mexico City – Toluca highway, and several other roads in the Mexico City Metropolitan Area experienced flooding. The Mexico City Metro (STC) also implemented safety measures for several of its lines, such as the manual operation of trains and decrease in travel speed. The San Jerónimo Canal overflowed in the El Rosal neighborhood in Magdalena Contreras. A tree measuring 15 m (49 ft) in height completely blocked a road and a total of 33 structures were inundated throughout Mexico City.

== See also ==
- Weather of 2018
- Tropical cyclones in 2018
- List of Eastern Pacific tropical storms
- Other tropical cyclones named Ileana
- Hurricane Erick (2013) – Category 1 hurricane that followed a similar path and affected similar areas
