= Budd =

Budd may refer to:

== People ==
- Budd (given name)
- Budd (surname)

== Places ==
- Budd Coast, Wilkes Land, Antarctica
- Budd Creek, California
- Budd Peak (Enderby Land), Antarctica
- Budd Peak (Heard Island), Indian Ocean
  - Budd Pass
- Budd Inlet, a southern arm of Puget Sound, Washington
- Budd Lake (disambiguation)
- Budd, Manitoba, Canada; see Budd station

== Other uses ==
- Budd (band), an Australian heavy rock band
- Budd Company, a metal fabricator and major supplier of body components to the automobile industry
- Budd (EP), by Rapeman
- Budd Rail Diesel Car
- Budd (shirtmakers), a high-end London tailor

== See also ==
- Budd–Chiari syndrome, the clinical picture caused by occlusion of the hepatic vein or inferior vena cava
- East Budd Island, Mac. Robertson Land, Antarctica
- West Budd Island, Mac. Robertson Land, Antarctica
- Bud (disambiguation)
