= Bud (disambiguation) =

Bud is a botanical term referring to an undeveloped or embryonic shoot.

Bud may also refer to:

== Companies ==
- Budweiser, a global pale lager brand
- Bud Industries, a manufacturer and supplier of electronics enclosures
- BUD, ticker symbol of Anheuser-Busch InBev on the New York Stock Exchange

== Places ==
- Bud, Indiana, a small town in the United States
- Bud, West Virginia, a census-designated place in the United States
- Bud, Wisconsin, an unincorporated community in the United States
- Bud, Norway, a village
- Bud Municipality, a former municipality in Norway

== People ==
- Bud (nickname), a list of people
- Bud (surname)

== Fictional characters ==
- Bud Bundy, on the TV series Married with Children
- Bud Compson, on the TV series Arthur
- Larry "Bud" Melman, on Late Night with David Letterman and Late Show with David Letterman, portrayed by Calvert DeForest
- Bud Roberts, on the TV series JAG
- Bud (Saint Seiya), in the anime series Saint Seiya

== Other uses ==
- Hurricane Bud (disambiguation), several hurricanes
- Buds (The Stems album), 1991
- Buds (Ovlov album), 2021
- Basic Underwater Demolition or "BUD/S", a military specialization within the United States Navy SEALs
- Big ugly dish, slang term for a large satellite dish used to receive satellite television signals on the C band
- Black Urine Disease, a defect in a metabolic enzyme which causes urine to turn black
- BUD, IATA code for Budapest Ferenc Liszt International Airport (formerly Budapest Ferihegy), serving Budapest, Hungary
- bud, ISO 639 code for the Ntcham language, spoken in Togo and Ghana
- Bud (dog), mascot of the first successful automobile trip across the United States

== See also ==
- Budd (disambiguation)
- Budding (disambiguation)
- Buddy (disambiguation)
