= Budd Peak =

Budd Peak may refer to:

- Budd Peak (Enderby Land)
- Budd Peak (Heard Island)
