= Budding (disambiguation) =

Budding is the formation of a new organism by the protrusion of part of another organism.

Budding may also refer to:

- Production of buds by plants
- Apocrine secretion from cells
- Budding (grafting), a technique for propagating plants such as fruit trees

- Shield budding, a method used for tree budding

- Budding (surname)

== See also ==
- Bud (disambiguation)
