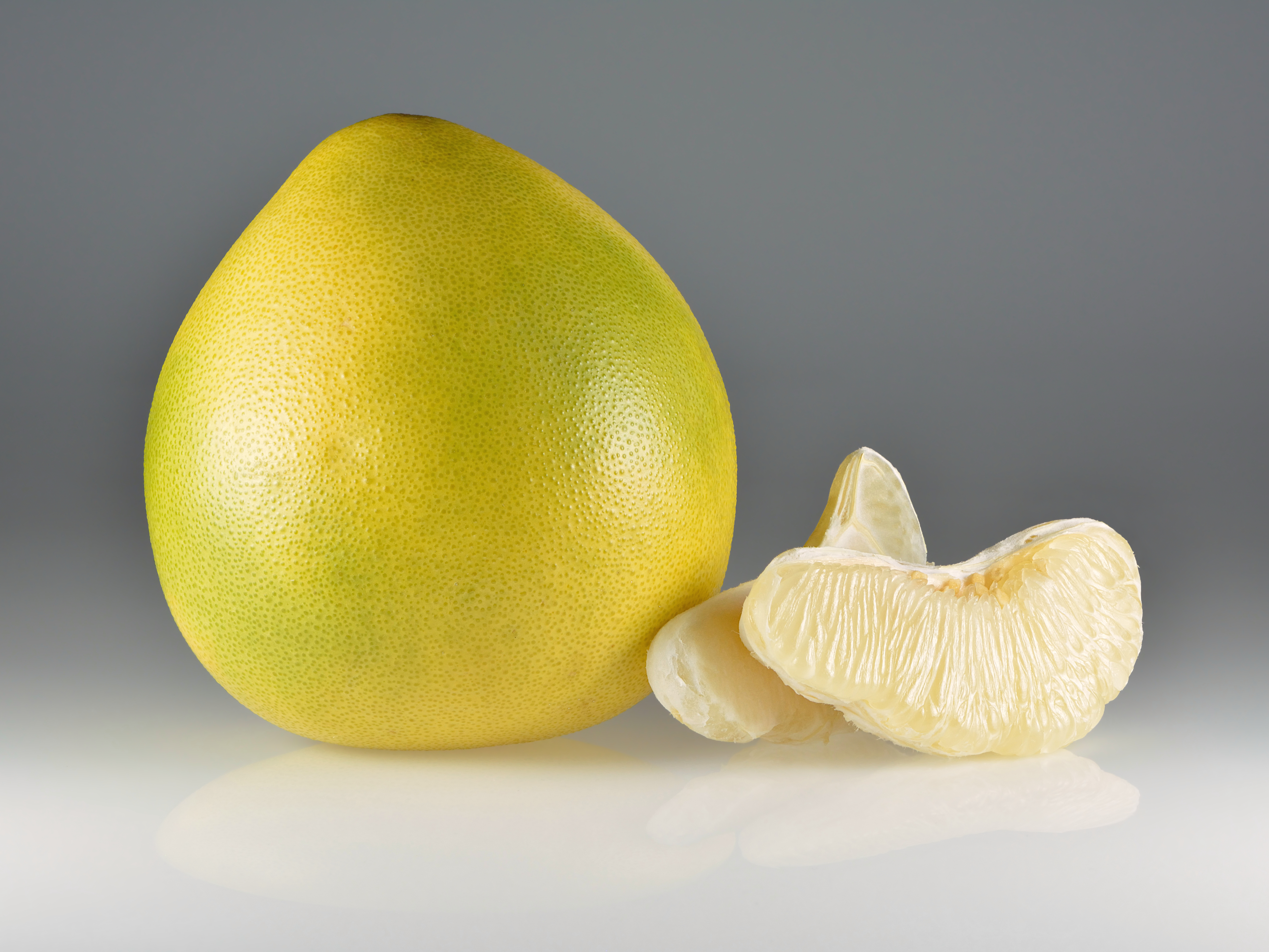

Conservation status
- Least Concern (IUCN 3.1)

Scientific classification
- Kingdom: Plantae
- Clade: Tracheophytes
- Clade: Angiosperms
- Clade: Eudicots
- Clade: Rosids
- Order: Sapindales
- Family: Rutaceae
- Genus: Citrus
- Species: C. maxima

Binomial name
- Citrus maxima (Burm.) Merr.

= Pomelo =

Citrus fruit from Southeast Asia

The pomelo (/ˈpɒmɪloʊ, ˈpʌm-/ POM-il-oh, PUM-; or pummelo, Citrus maxima), also known as a shaddock, is the largest citrus fruit. It is an ancestor of several cultivated citrus species, including the bitter orange and the grapefruit. It is a natural, non-hybrid citrus fruit, native to Southeast Asia. Similar in taste to a sweet grapefruit, the pomelo is commonly eaten and used for festive occasions throughout Southeast and East Asia. As with the grapefruit, phytochemicals in the pomelo have the potential for drug interactions.

== Description ==
The pomelo tree can be 5–15 metres (16–50 feet) tall, with a trunk, often rather crooked, that is 10–30 centimetres (4–12 inches) thick, and low-hanging, irregular branches. The petioles (leaf stalks) are distinctly winged. The leaves are alternate, ovate or elliptic in shape, and 5–20 cm (2–8 in) long; they are leathery and dull green above, hairy beneath. The flowers, produced singly or in clusters, are fragrant and yellow-white.

The fruit is large, 10–30 cm (4–12 in) in diameter, round or somewhat pear-shaped. Its weight varies by cultivar from 0.26–1.95 kilograms (0.6–4.3 pounds). It has a thicker peel than a grapefruit, and is divided into 11 to 18 segments. The flesh is less acidic than that of the grapefruit.

The pomelo has at least sixty cultivars. The fruit generally contains a few, relatively large seeds, but some cultivars have numerous seeds. The characteristics of pomelo vary widely across South Asia.

The pomelo is native to Southeast Asia and all of Malaysia. The tree may have been introduced to China around 100 BCE, and is now heavily cultivated in Southern China. Seeds of the tree were first brought to the Americas in the late 1600s.

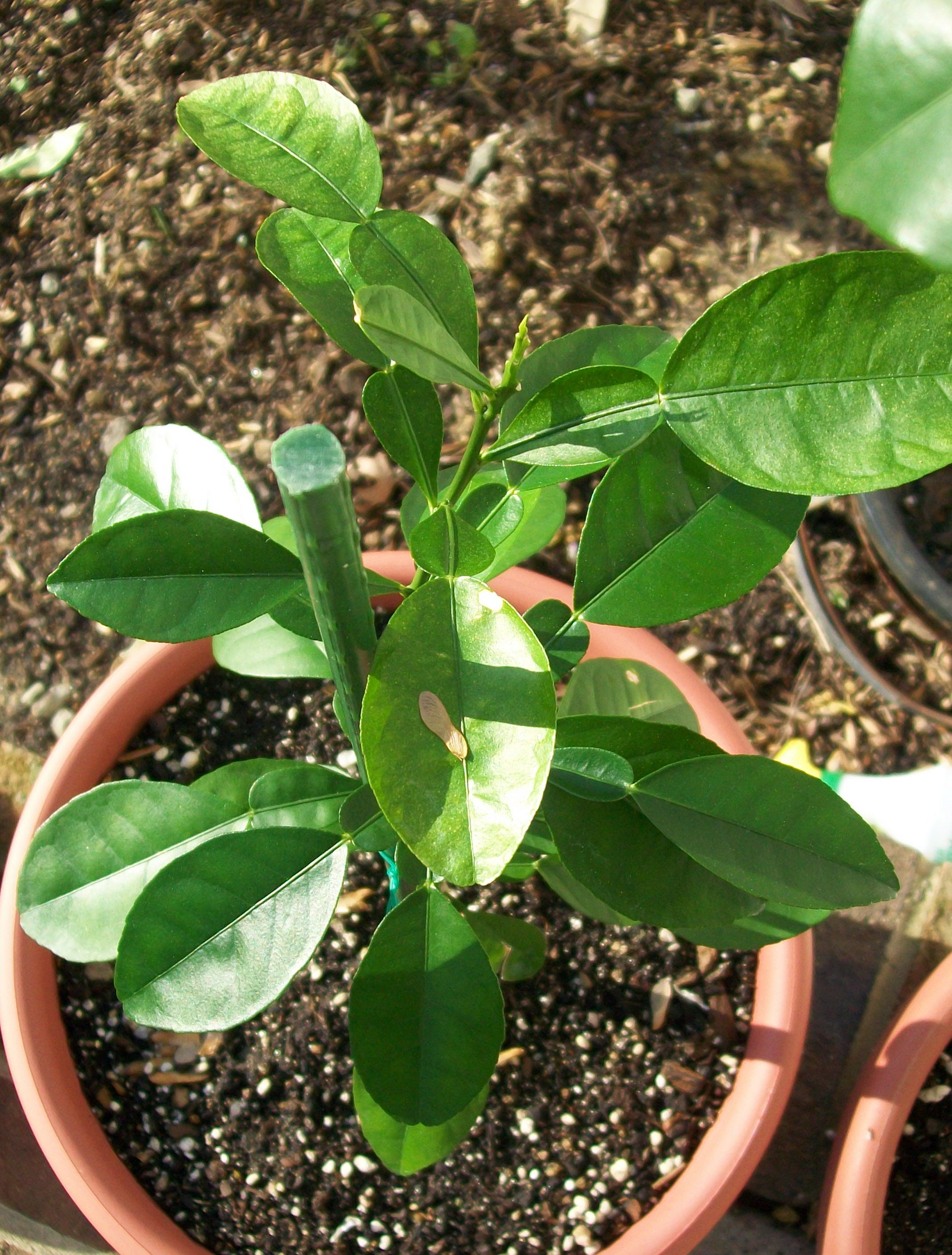
Seedling

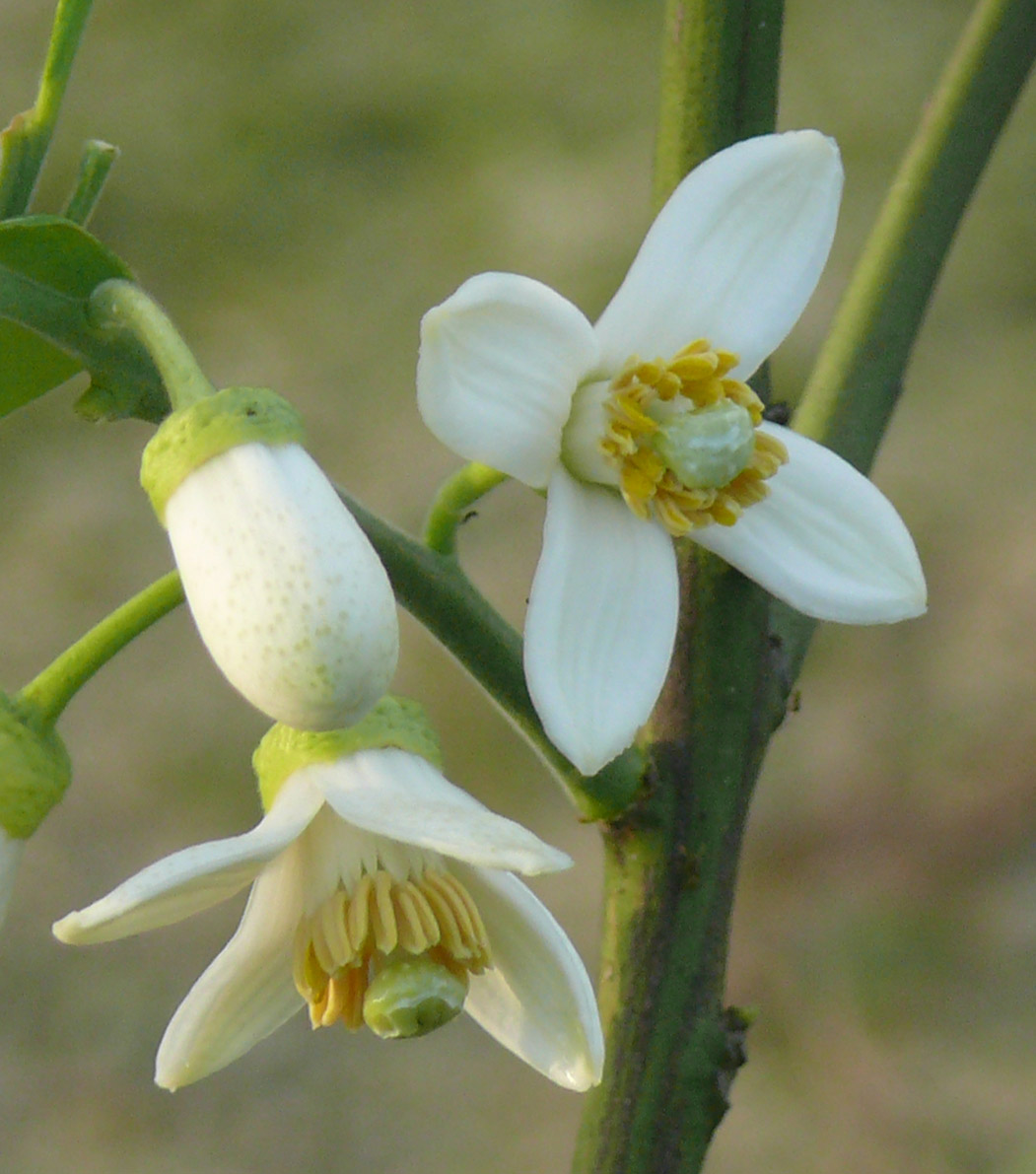
Flowers

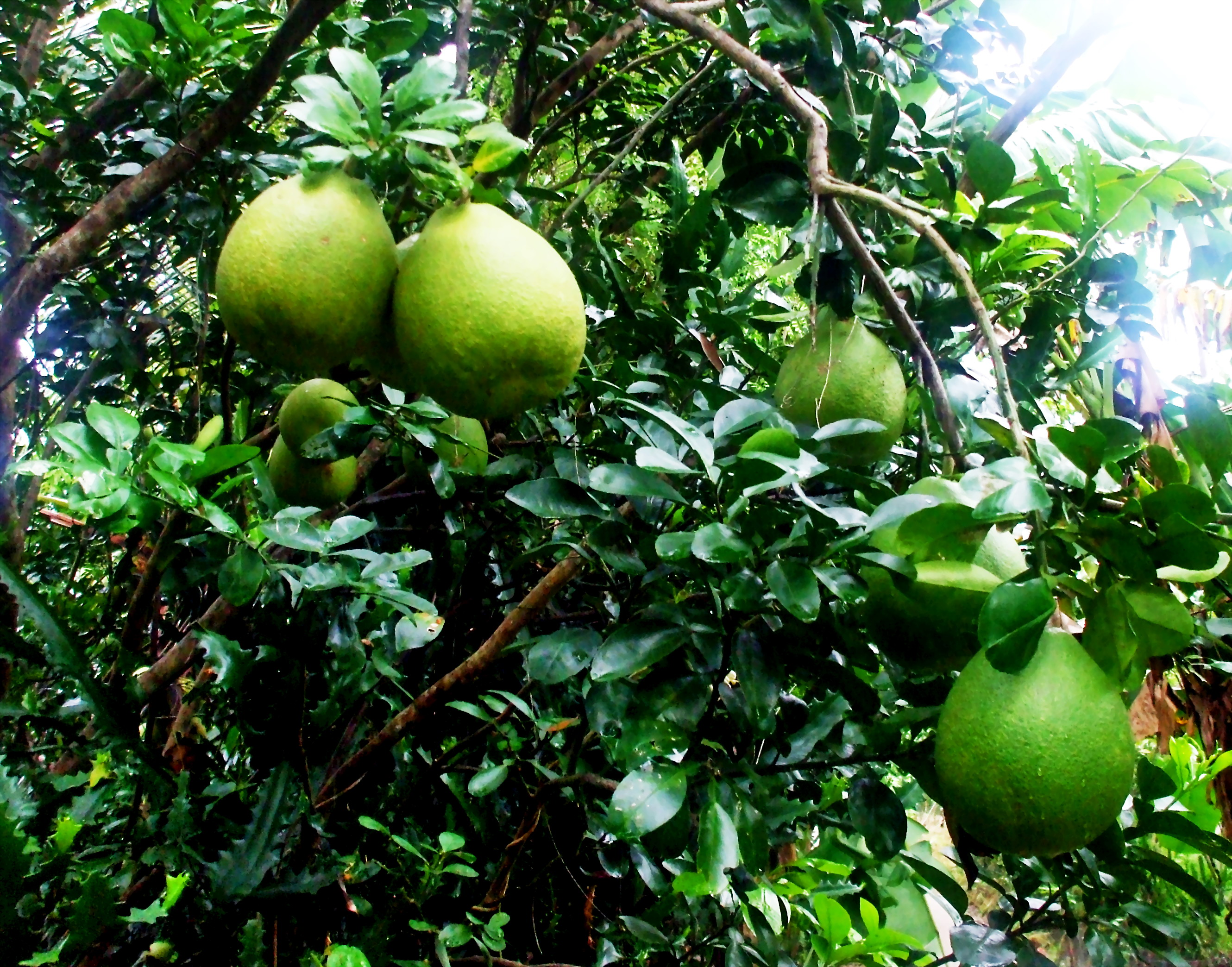
Tree

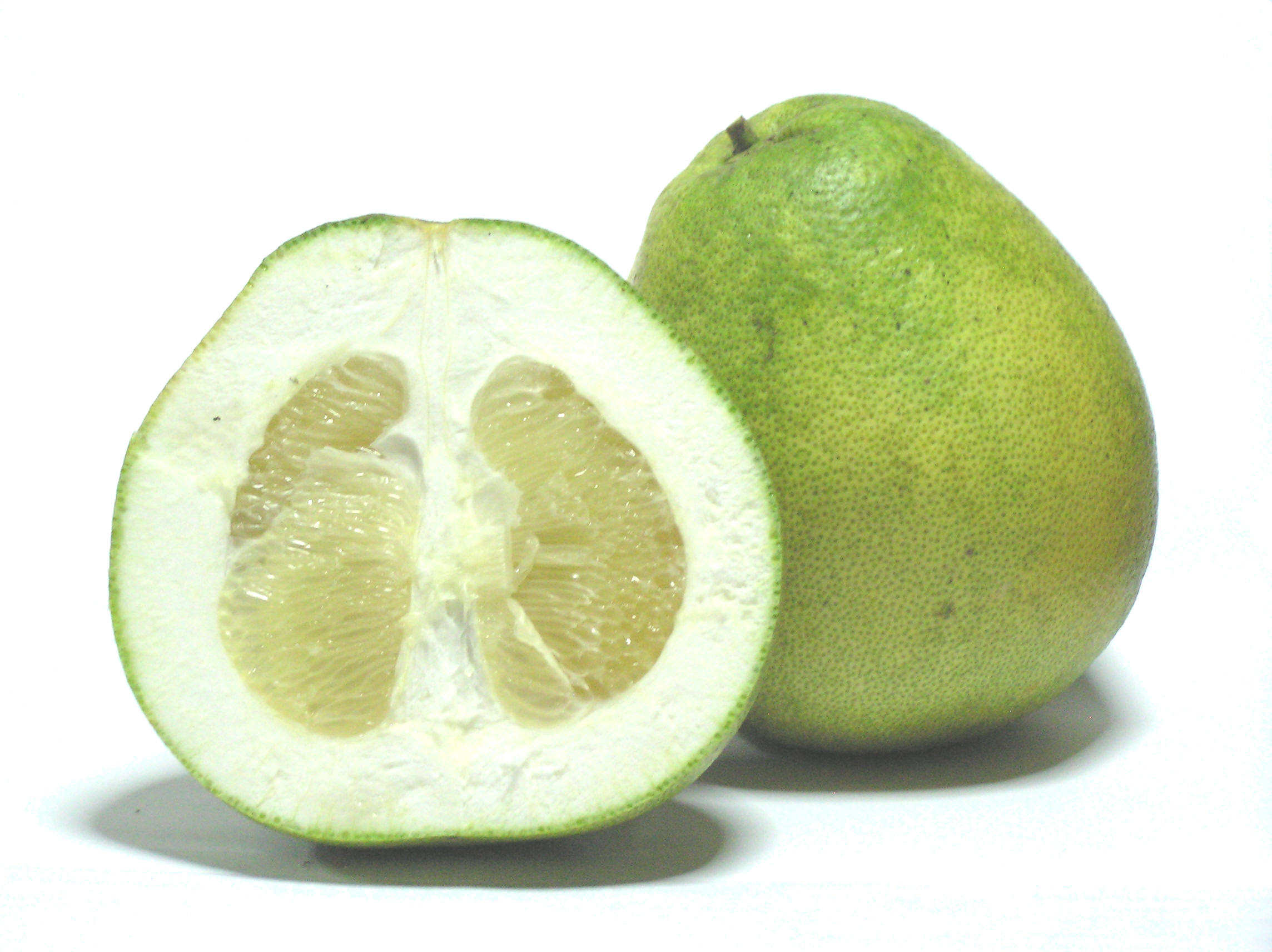
Fruit

== History ==
=== Ancestral Citrus species ===
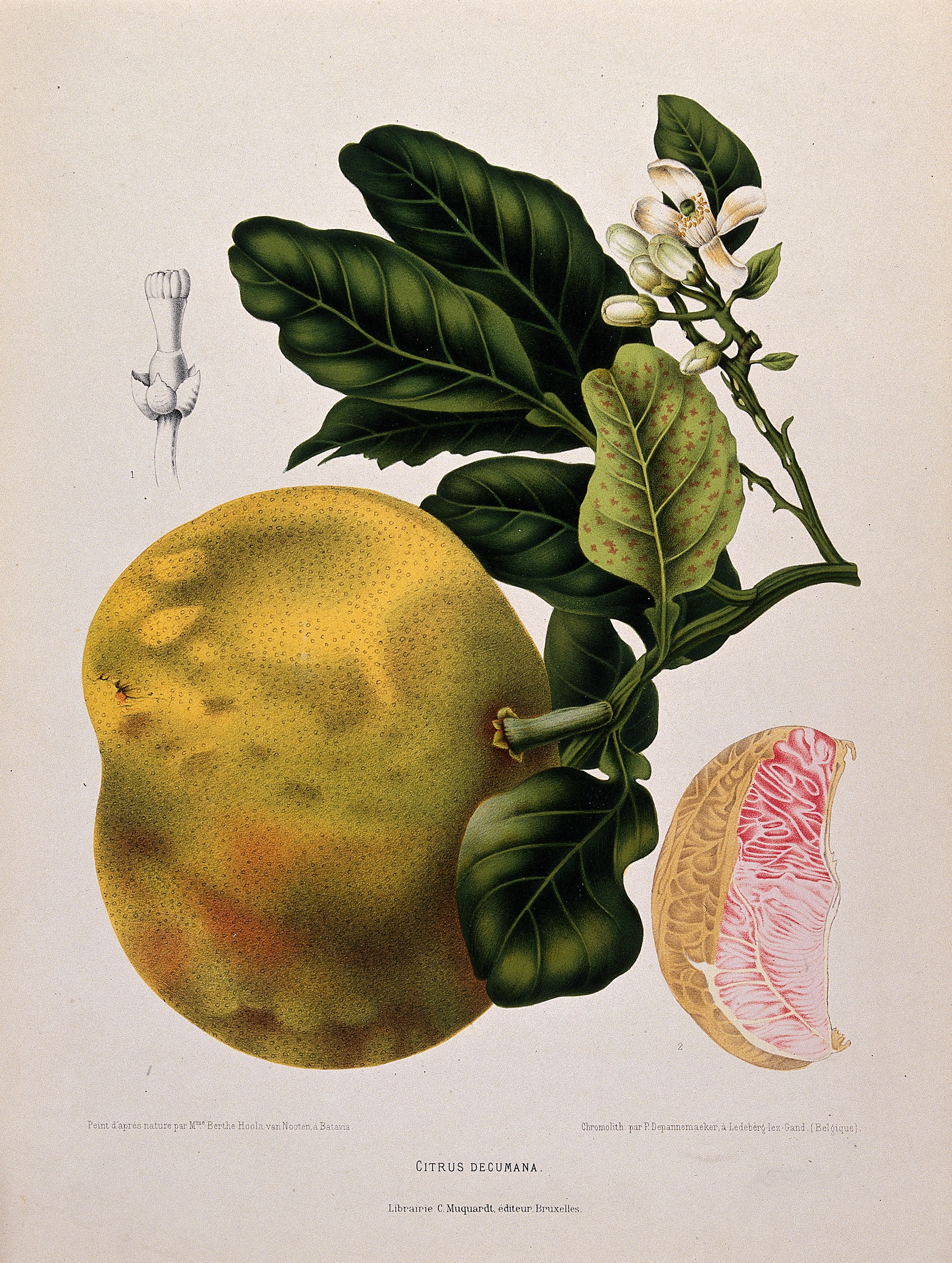
Flowering and fruiting branch, chromolithograph by P. Depannemaeker, c. 1885

The pomelo is significant botanically as one of the three major wild ancestors of several cultivated hybrid Citrus species, including the bitter orange and the grapefruit; and less directly also of the lemon, the sweet orange, and some types of mandarin. The bitter orange is a naturally occurring hybrid between the pomelo and the mandarin. The grapefruit is a hybrid between a pomelo and a sweet orange; typically, 63% of the grapefruit's genome comes from the pomelo. The bitter orange is a hybrid of wild type mandarin and pomelo; in turn, the lemon is a hybrid of bitter orange and citron, i.e. cultivated lemons have some pomelo ancestry. In addition, there has been repeated introgression of pomelo genes into both early cultivated hybrid mandarins and later mandarin varieties, these last also involving hybridisation with the sweet orange. Pomelo genes are thus included in many types of cultivated Citrus.

The pomelo is one of the wild ancestors of cultivated Citrus species including the bitter orange and the grapefruit, and less directly also of the lemon, the sweet orange, and some types of mandarin.

=== Etymology ===
According to the Oxford English Dictionary, the etymology of the word "pomelo" is uncertain. It may be derived from Dutch pompelmoes. The Dutch name in turn has uncertain etymology, but is possibly derived from Dutch pompel ("swollen") or pompoen ("pumpkin"), combined with limoes ("lemon, citrus fruit"), influenced by Portuguese limões with the same meaning. An alternative possibility is that the Dutch name derives from Portuguese pomos limões ("citrus fruit"). The specific name maxima is the feminine form of the Latin word meaning "biggest".

One theory for the alternative English name "shaddock" is that it was adopted after the plant's introduction into Barbados by a "Captain Shaddock" of the East India Company (apparently Philip Chaddock, who visited the island in the late 1640s). From there the name spread to Jamaica in 1696.

=== Taxonomy ===
In his Herbarium Amboinense, published posthumously in 1741, Georg Eberhard Rumphius named it Limo decumanus. In 1753, Carl Linnaeus mentioned the plant as a subspecies, Citrus aurantium var grandis. In 1755, Johannes Burman validly described the species from the type specimen, giving it the name Aurantium maximum, now considered a basionym. In 1757, Pehr Osbeck named it Citrus grandis. Linnaeus revisited the taxonomy in 1767, renaming the species as Citrus decumana. In 1917, Elmer Drew Merrill revised and renamed it Citrus maxima. Aurantioideae remains as a subfamily.

=== Genomics ===
An essentially complete genome assembly of pomelo was published in 2026. The two haplotypes span approximately 344 Mb and 343 Mb, respectively, and each was assembled into nine chromosomes. The assemblies have BUSCO completeness scores of 99.36% and 99.66%, and 27,417 and 27,414 protein-coding genes were predicted in the two haplotypes, respectively.

== As food ==
=== Nutrition ===
Pomelo, raw
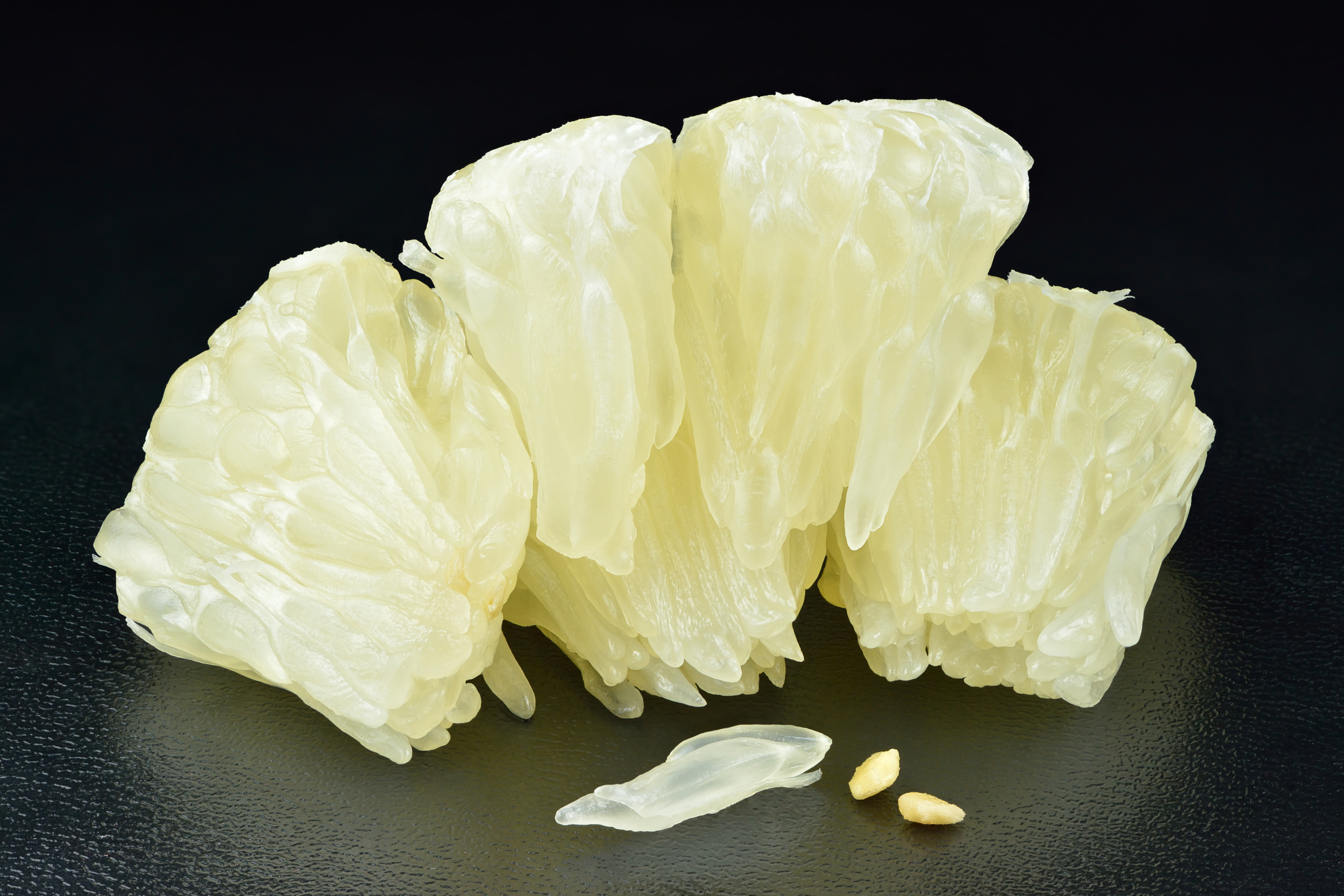
- Flesh of a pomelo

Nutritional value per 100 g (3.5 oz)
- Energy: 159 kJ (38 kcal)
- Carbohydrates: 9.62 g
- Dietary fibre: 1 g
- Fat: 0.04 g
- Protein: 0.76 g
Vitamins and minerals
Vitamins	Quantity %DV^{†}
Thiamine (B1)	3% 0.034 mg
Riboflavin (B2)	2% 0.027 mg
Niacin (B3)	1% 0.22 mg
Vitamin B6	2% 0.036 mg
Vitamin C	68% 61 mg
Minerals	Quantity %DV^{†}
Iron	1% 0.11 mg
Magnesium	1% 6 mg
Manganese	1% 0.017 mg
Phosphorus	1% 17 mg
Potassium	7% 216 mg
Sodium	0% 1 mg
Zinc	1% 0.08 mg
- Other constituents: Quantity
- Water: 89 g
- Link to USDA Database entry
- ^{†}Percentages estimated using US recommendations for adults, except for potassium, which is estimated based on expert recommendation from the National Academies.

Raw pomelo flesh is 89% water, 10% carbohydrates, 1% protein, and contains negligible fat. A 100-gram reference amount provides 159 kilojoules (38 kilocalories) of food energy, and is rich in vitamin C (68% of the Daily Value), with no other micronutrients in significant content (table).

=== Culinary ===
The flesh and juice are edible, and the peel may be candied. It is eaten as a dessert, or used in salads. In the Philippines, a pink beverage is made from pomelo and pineapple juice.

In East Asia, especially in Cantonese cuisine, braised pomelo pith is used to make dishes that are high in fibre and low in fat.

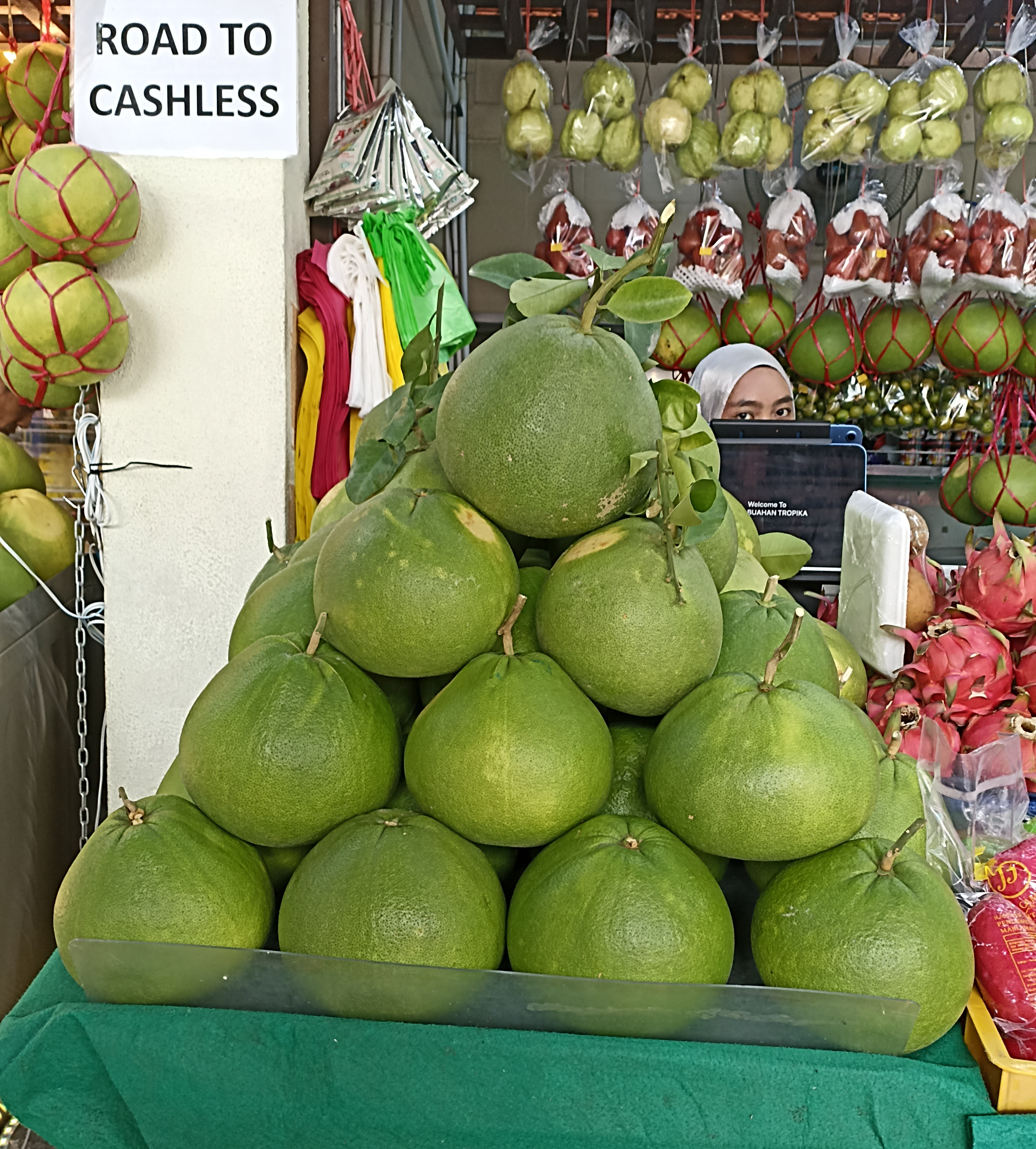
Ipoh pomelos on sale in Malaysia

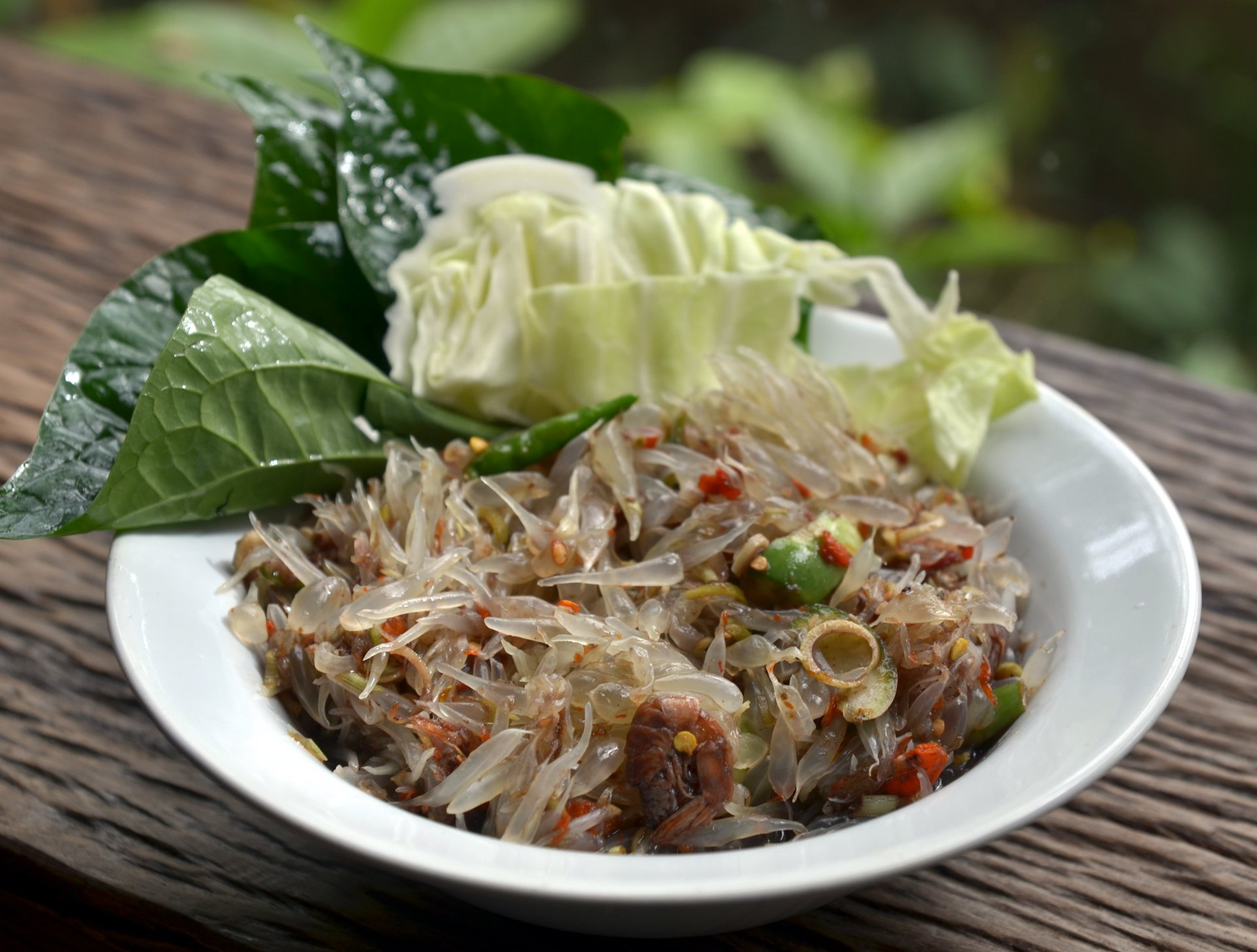
Tam som-o nam pu: spicy Thai pomelo salad with crab extract

=== Drug interactions ===
The pomelo, while not itself toxic, can cause adverse interactions similar to those caused by the grapefruit with a wide range of prescription drugs. These occur by the inhibition of cytochrome P450-mediated metabolism of prescription drugs including for example some anti-hypertensives, some anticoagulants, some anticancer agents, some anti-infective agents, some statins, and some immunosuppressants.

== Cultivation ==
The seeds of the pomelo are monoembryonic, producing seedlings with genes from both parents, so they do not breed true to type. However, they are usually fairly similar to the tree they grow from and therefore in Asia, pomelos are typically grown from seed. Seeds can be stored for 80 days at a temperature of 5 °C (41 °F) with moderate relative humidity. Pomelos can be propagated vegetatively by air-layering, by taking cuttings, by grafting, by shield budding, or by tissue culture.

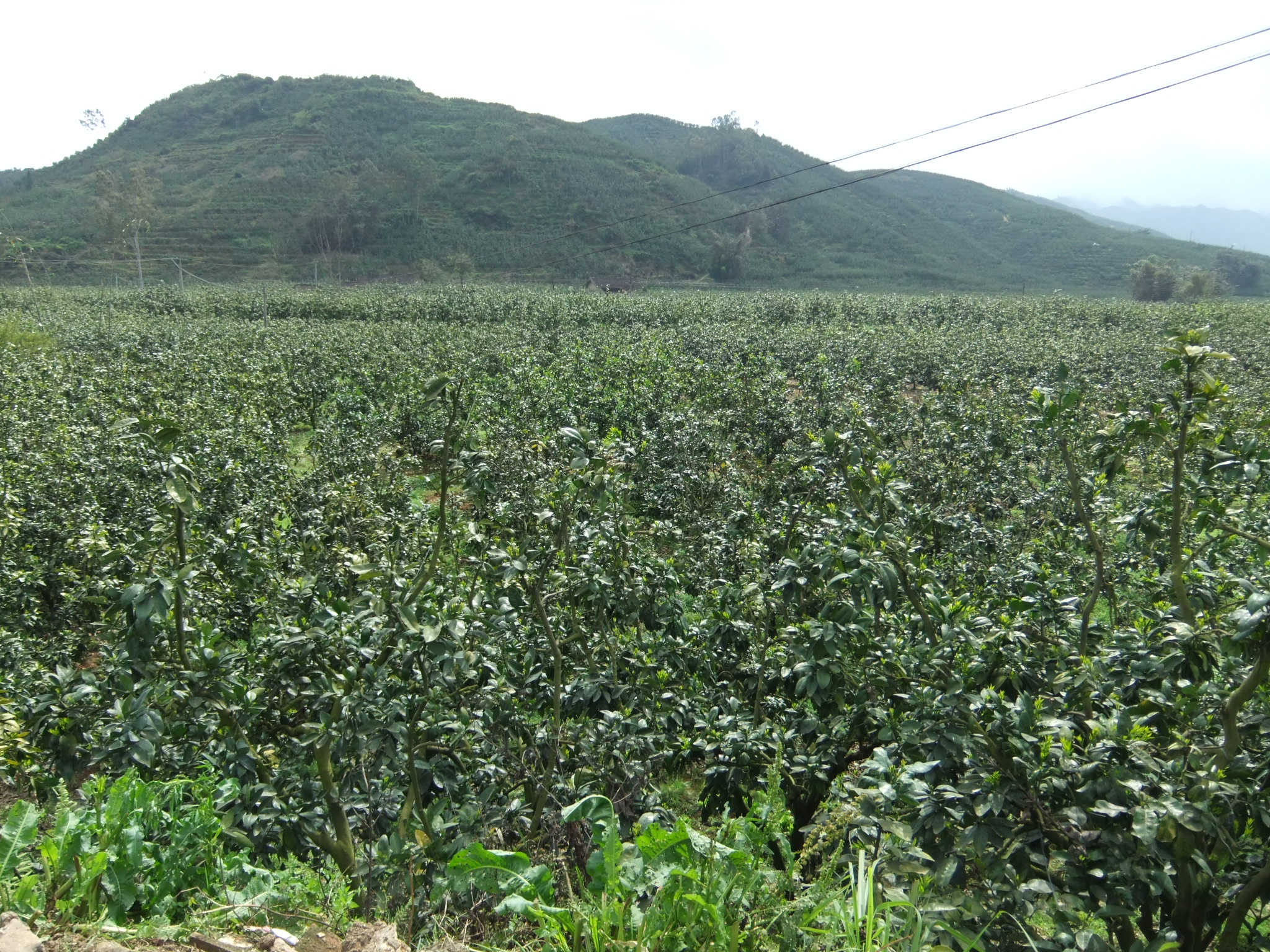
Pomelos in Fujian

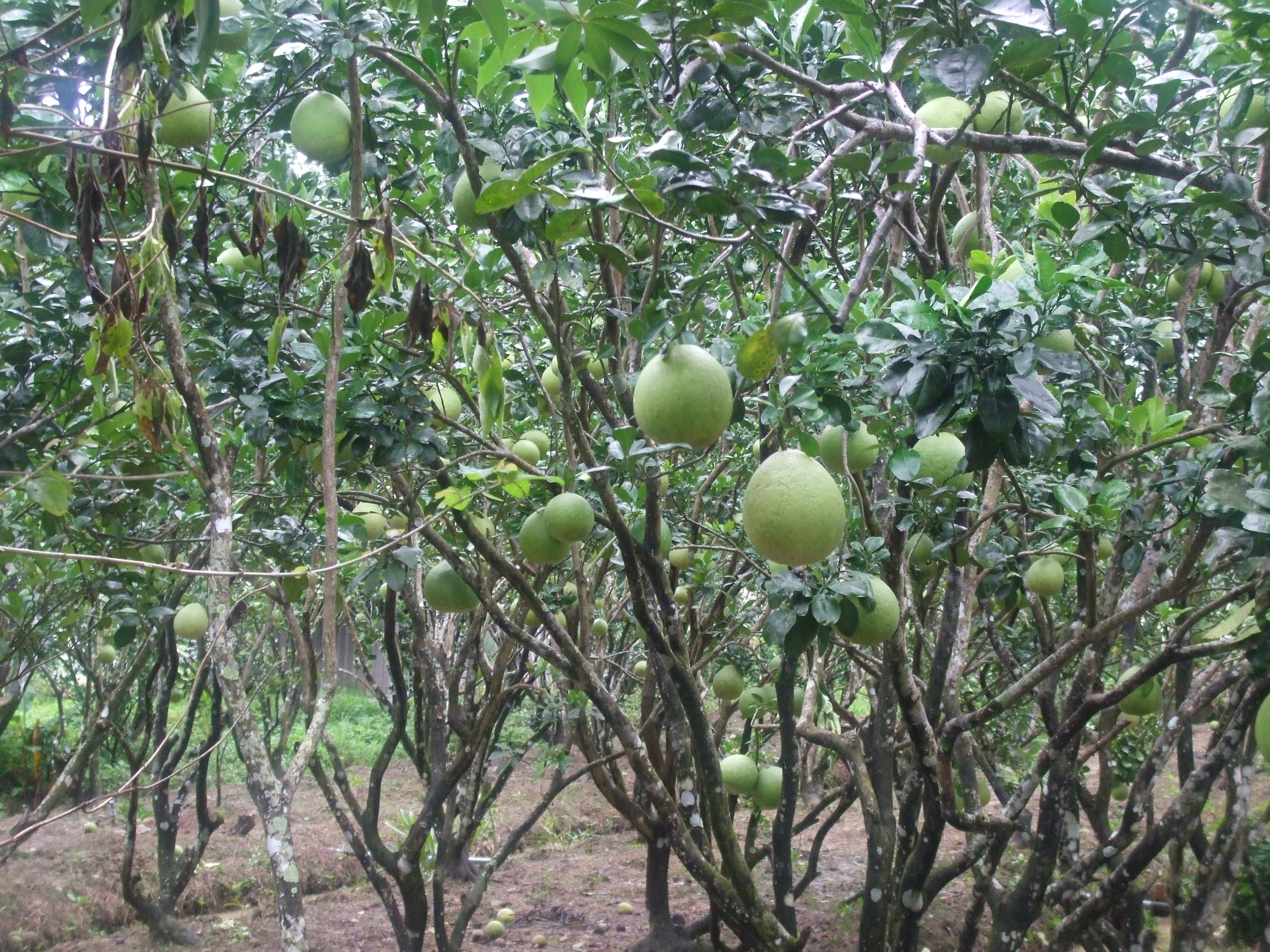
Orchard in Vietnam

== In culture ==
The pomelo features in cultural and spiritual festivals across Asia. In China, during the Lunar New Year festival, the fruit is offered to ancestors. Its name is similar to the word for "to have" (有, yǒu), making it a symbol of prosperity and family unity. In Thailand, pomelo is used in rituals such as the Songkran festival. In the Hindu festival of Chhath Puja, pomelo is used as an offering.

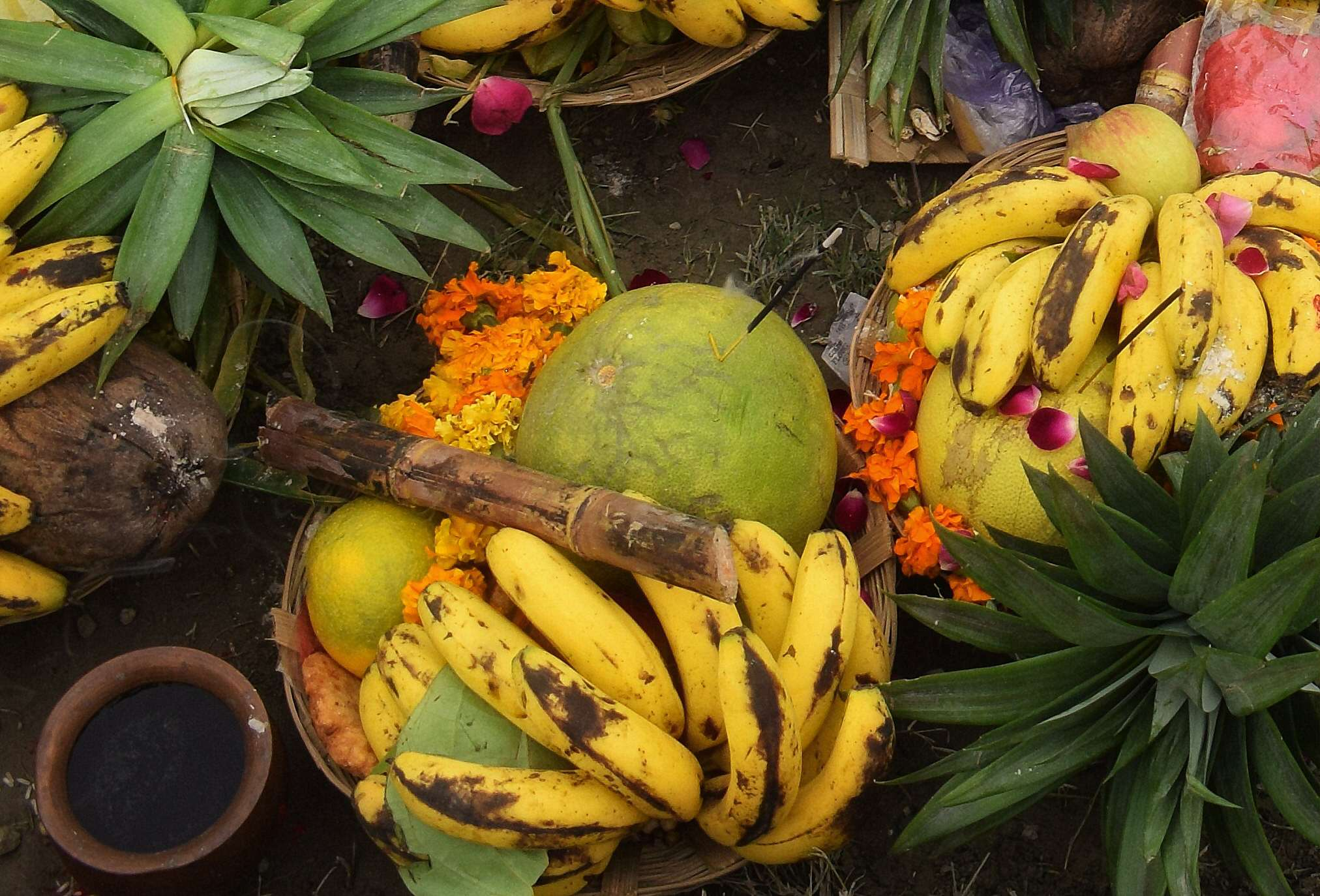
Chhath Puja with pomelo, India
