= Budd Lake =

Budd Lake may refer to:

== Communities ==
- Budd Lake, New Jersey, an unincorporated community in Morris County

== Lakes ==
- Budd Lake (California), in Yosemite National Park
- Budd Lake (Michigan), in Clare County
- Budd Lake (Clearwater County, Minnesota)
- Budd Lake (Martin County, Minnesota)
- Budd Lake (New Jersey), in Morris County
