= Senator Earle =

Senator Earle may refer to:

- Elias Earle (1762–1823), South Carolina State Senate
- Horatio Earle (1855–1935), Michigan State Senate
- James T. Earle (1814–1882), Maryland State Senate
- Joseph H. Earle (1847–1897), U.S. Senator from South Carolina

== See also ==
- Jane Earll (born 1958), Pennsylvania State Senate
- Jonas Earll Jr. (1786–1846), New York State Senate
