= Buddy =

Buddy may refer to:

== People ==
- Buddy (nickname)
- Buddy (rapper) (born 1993), born Simmie Sims III
- Brett "Buddy" Ascott (born 1959), British drummer
- Buddy Austin, American professional wrestler
- Buddy Cage (1946–2020), American pedal steel guitarist, member of the New Riders of the Purple Sage
- Buddy Carter, American politician
- Buddy Ebsen, American actor and dancer
- Buddy Guy, American blues guitarist
- Buddy Hackett, American comedian
- Buddy Holly (1936–1959), artistic name for American singer-songwriter Charles Hardin Holley
- Buddy Jewell (born 1961), American country musician
- Buddy Knox (1933–1999), American singer and songwriter
- Buddy Knox (guitarist), Australian musician
- Buddy Lee Parker (born 1962), American retired professional wrestler
- Buddy Rich, American jazz drummer
- Buddy Roemer, American politician, former governor of Louisiana
- Buddy Vedder (born 1994), Dutch actor and television presenter
- Buddy Wayne (1967–2017), American professional wrestler
- Buddy Wolfe (1941–2017), American football player and professional wrestler

== Fictional characters ==
- Buddy, a character in the 1983 American made-for-television drama movie Baby Sister
- Buddy (Looney Tunes), a character from Looney Tunes
- Buddy, a blue mute rat in The Nut Job, and its sequel The Nut Job 2: Nutty by Nature
- Buddy, a character in the video game Lisa: The Painful
- Buddy, one of the four protagonists in SuperKitties
- Buddy, a member of the Short Circus on the American television series The Electric Company
- Buddy, a T. Rex and protagonist of Dinosaur Train
- Buddy Bradley, the protagonist of Peter Bagge's comic book Hate!
- Buddy Boar, a character of animated television series Taz-Mania
- Buddy Baker, aka Animal Man, from DC Comics
- Buddy Cole (character), recurring character on the Canadian sketch-comedy show The Kids In The Hall portrayed by Scott Thompson
- Buddy Hobbs, protagonist of the film Elf, played by Will Ferrell
- Buddy Lee, a doll that served as an advertising mascot for Lee Jeans in the mid-20th century and the turn of the 21st century
- Buddy Lembeck, a character on the 1980s TV sitcom Charles in Charge
- Letitia "Buddy" Lawrence, the younger daughter on the 1970s TV drama Family
- Buddy Love, the alter ego of the Nutty Professor in the 1963 and 1996 films of that name
- Buddy Pine, the alter ego of Syndrome, the supervillain from the 2004 film The Incredibles
- Buddy Sanderson, a character in the 2001 American supernatural parody movie Scary Movie 2
- Buddy Threadgoode, a character in Fried Green Tomatoes

== Transportation ==
- Buddy (electric car), a Norwegian electric car
- Buddy (scooter), a motor scooter

== Books ==
- Buddy (Hinton novel), a 1982 novel by Nigel Hinton
- Buddy (Herlong novel), a 2012 novel by M.H. Herlong

== Film and television ==
- Buddy film, a genre in which two (or on occasion, more than two) people, often both men, are put together
- Buddy (1997 film), a film about a gorilla named Buddy
- Buddy (2003 film), a Norwegian film
- Buddy (2013 German film), a comedy film
- Buddy (2013 Indian film), a drama film
- Buddy (2024 film), an Indian Telugu-language film
- Buddy (2026 film), an American horror-thriller film
- Buddy (TV series), a 1986 BBC schools drama

== Music ==
- Buddy: The Buddy Holly Story, a jukebox musical on the career of Buddy Holly
- Buddy, artistic name for Italian singer Gianni Nazzaro
- Buddy (German singer), artistic name for German singer Sebastian Erl
- Buddy (band), a California indie pop band
- "Buddy" (De La Soul song), a 1989 song by De La Soul
- "Buddy" (Musiq Soulchild song), a 2007 song by Musiq Soulchild
- "Buddy", a 1969 song on the Good Times album by Willie Nelson
- "Buddy", a 2007 song on the Action album by B'z
- "Buddy" (Maaya Sakamoto song), a 2011 song by Maaya Sakamoto
- "Buddy", fandom name for K-pop girl group GFriend

== Other uses ==
- Buddy (dog actor), dog appearing in Air Bud media
- Buddy (Bill Clinton's dog), pet of former U.S. President Bill Clinton
- Buddy Thunderstruck, fictional dog in the film of the same name
- Buddy (magazine), a music magazine serving the Texas area
- "The Buddies", nickname of St Mirren F.C., a football club based in Paisley

== See also ==
- Buddy L, an American toy company
- Buddy system, a procedure in which two people operate together as a single unit so that they are able to monitor and help each other
- My Buddy (doll), a doll made by Hasbro
- Bud (disambiguation)
- Buddies (disambiguation)
