= Buddies =

Buddies may refer to:

- Friendship, a relationship between two people who hold mutual affection for each other
- Buddies (TV series), the name of a short-lived sitcom starring Dave Chappelle that aired on ABC in 1996
- Buddies (1985 film), a 1985 American film
- Buddies (1983 film), a 1983 Australian film
- Buddies (2012 film), a 2012 Brazilian film
- The Buddies, an American doo wop group from the mid-20th century
- Buddies (EP), a 2010 EP by Frank Turner and Jon Snodgrass
- Buddies (play), a 1919 Broadway musical by George V. Hobart with music by Bentley Collingwood Hilliam
- Buddies (album), a 2003 compilation album by Lead, FLAME and w-inds
- Turtles, reptiles of the order Testundines, of which some species make for great animal companions.

== See also ==
- Buddy (disambiguation)
