= Budd Pass =

Mountain pass in Australia

Budd Pass (53°8′S 73°32′E) is a mountain pass in the ridge that extends southwest from Budd Peak on Heard Island. The pass is 1 nautical mile (2 km) southwest of Budd Peak. It was surveyed by Australian National Antarctic Research Expeditions (ANARE), 1948–63, and named by the Antarctic Names Committee of Australia for G.M. Budd, ANARE officer-in-charge on Heard Island in 1954 and leader of the 1963 ANARE Heard Island expedition.
