= Hurricane Bud (2018) =

Category 4 Pacific hurricane

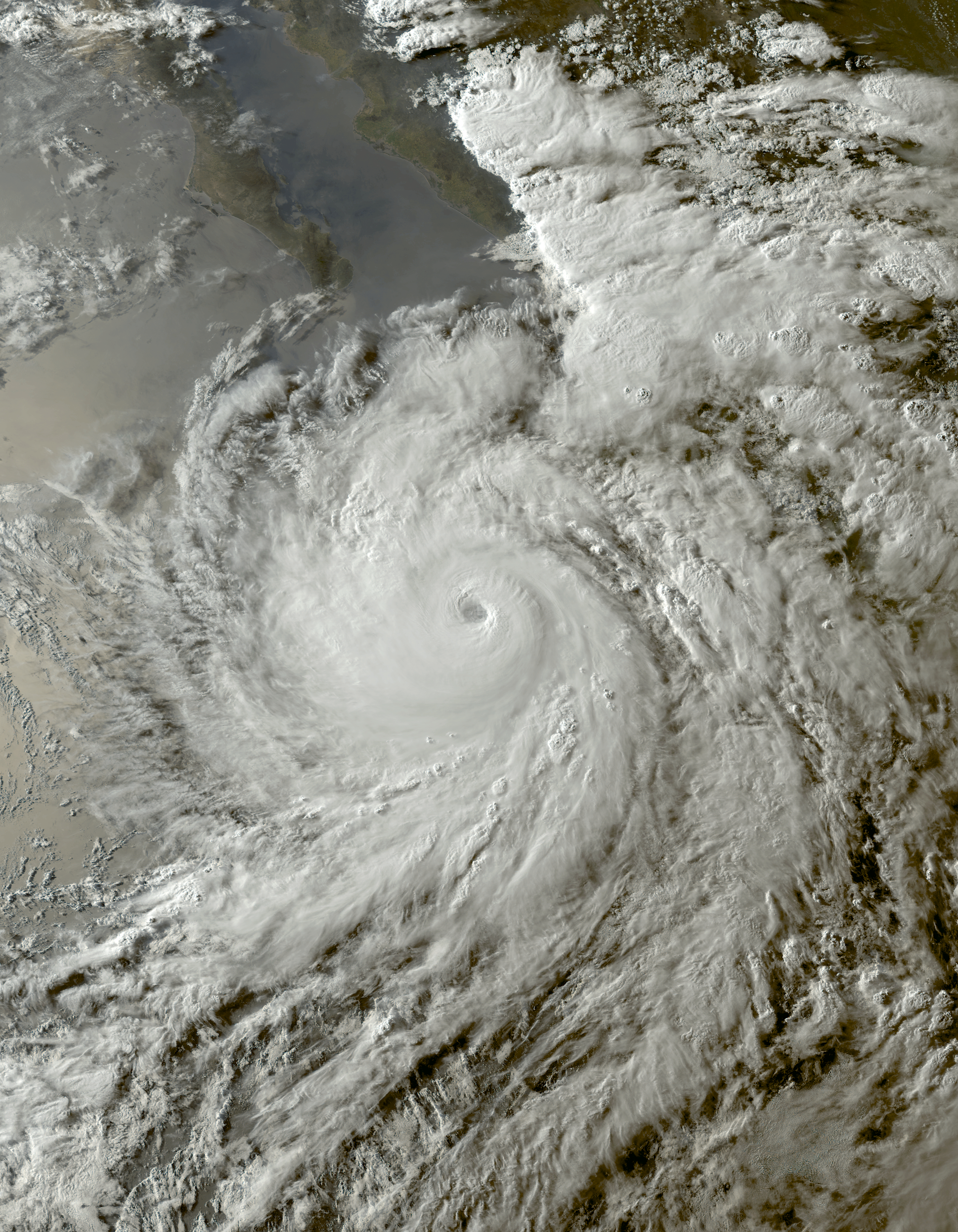
- Bud at peak intensity while off the coast of Mexico on June 11

Meteorological history
- Formed: June 9, 2018
- Remnant low: June 15, 2018
- Dissipated: June 16, 2018

Category 4 major hurricane
- 1-minute sustained (SSHWS/NWS)
- Highest winds: 140 mph (220 km/h)
- Lowest pressure: 943 mbar (hPa); 27.85 inHg

Overall effects
- Fatalities: 2 total
- Damage: $530,000 (2018 USD)
- Areas affected: Baja California Peninsula, Northwestern Mexico, Southwestern United States, Wyoming
- IBTrACS /
- Part of the 2018 Pacific hurricane season

Hurricane Bud was a tropical cyclone that brought winds and severe flooding to Mexico throughout its existence as a tropical cyclone in June 2018. It was the second named storm, hurricane, and major hurricane of the 2018 Pacific hurricane season. (Note: A major hurricane is one that ranks at Category 3 or higher on the Saffir–Simpson scale.) Bud originated from a tropical wave that departed from Western Africa on May 29. It traveled across the Atlantic Ocean before entering the Northeast Pacific Ocean late on June 6. The system moved towards the northwest and steadily organized, becoming a tropical depression on June 9 and Tropical Storm Bud early the next day. Favorable upper-level winds, ample moisture aloft, and warm sea surface temperatures allowed the storm to rapidly intensify to a hurricane late on June 10, and further to a major hurricane on the following day. Bud ultimately peaked the next morning with maximum sustained winds of 140 mph (230 km/h) and a minimum central pressure of 943 mbar (943 hPa; 27.8 inHg). Its track curved more northward while the storm rapidly succumbed to the effects of upwelling. Bud made landfall on Baja California Sur as a minimal tropical storm early on June 15. On the next day, land interaction and increasing wind shear caused Bud to degenerate into a post-tropical cyclone. It opened up into a trough of low-pressure on June 16. The remnants of Bud moved towards the Southwestern United States, bringing tropical moisture and gusty winds to the region.

Bud prompted the issuance of multiple watches and warnings for Baja California Sur and western and central Mexico. Bud caused two deaths in Mexico; one in Mexico City and another in Baja California Sur. The storm also caused a damage of US$478,000. (Note: All currencies are in their 2018 values and are converted to United States dollars using data from the International Monetary Fund published by the World Bank.) Despite remaining offshore for most of its track, the hurricane caused torrential rainfall and severe flooding in several regions. A peak rainfall total of 6.50 in (165 mm) was recorded in San Lorenzo, Sinaloa. In Guadalajara, Jalisco, hundreds of vehicles were inundated and swept away. A canal overflowed in Guadalajara, causing damage to multiple stores in a mall. At least 100 additional structures were damaged in the city. In Guerrero, hundreds of businesses and homes were flooded. Over 100 businesses in Pie de la Cuesta were damaged by strong waves. More than 60 homes in Maruata, Michoacan, experienced flood or wind damage. Severe flooding along a street in Mexico City inundated dozens of vehicles, necessitating the rescue of their passengers. Rains from Bud's remnants brought relief to drought-stricken areas and slowed the growth of wildfires in Wyoming and Colorado. The influx of moisture prompted the issuance of flash flood watches for Colorado and New Mexico, and caused flooding near Cave Creek, Arizona.

== Meteorological history ==
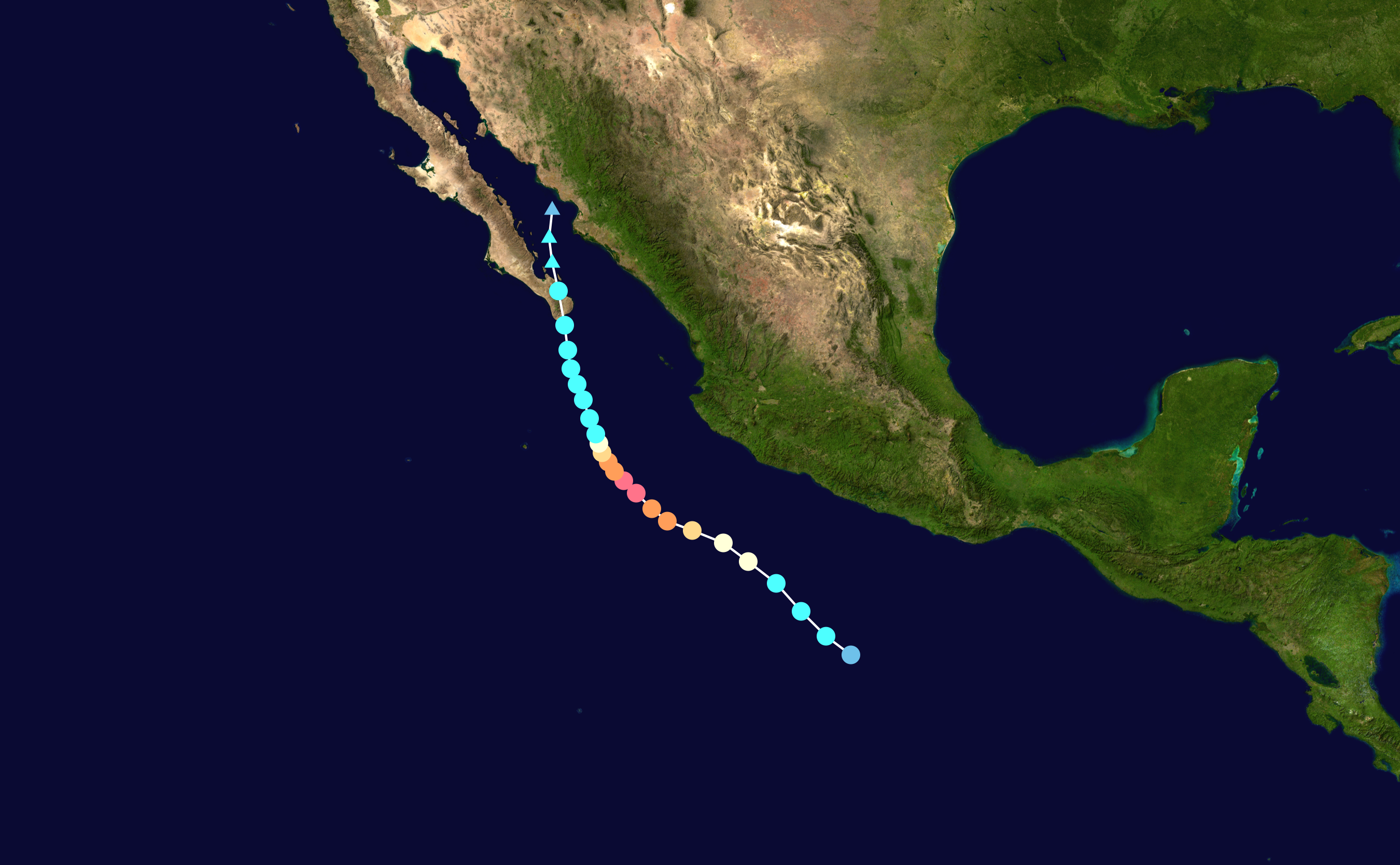
Map plotting the storm's track and intensity, according to the Saffir–Simpson scale Map key Saffir–Simpson scale Tropical depression (≤38 mph, ≤62 km/h) Tropical storm (39–73 mph, 63–118 km/h) Category 1 (74–95 mph, 119–153 km/h) Category 2 (96–110 mph, 154–177 km/h) Category 3 (111–129 mph, 178–208 km/h) Category 4 (130–156 mph, 209–251 km/h) Category 5 (≥157 mph, ≥252 km/h) Unknown Storm type Tropical cyclone Subtropical cyclone Extratropical cyclone, remnant low, tropical disturbance, or monsoon depression

Hurricane Bud started as a tropical wave that moved off Africa's west coast and into the Atlantic Ocean on May 29. During the next week, the wave propagated westward, before moving over northern South America and entering the Eastern Pacific Ocean on June 6. Over the next couple of days, atmospheric convection associated with the system significantly increased, before an area of low pressure developed on June 9. Later that day, the National Hurricane Center (NHC) initiated advisories on the system, as it had developed into a tropical depression, while located about 330 mi (530 km) south of Acapulco, Mexico. Six hours later, the depression intensified into a tropical storm, receiving the name Bud from the NHC, as banding features – significantly elongated, curved bands of rain clouds – wrapped into the system's center. Meanwhile, the storm was steered north-westwards around a high-pressure ridge.

Bud began a period of rapid intensification soon after, amid a favorable environment of very warm sea surface temperatures, high mid-level moisture, and low vertical wind shear. The storm developed a central dense overcast and an eye feature at its mid-levels as it quickly consolidated. By 18:00 UTC on June 10, Bud had strengthened into a Category 1 hurricane as a sporadic eye feature began to emerge on visible satellite imagery. The cyclone became a Category 3 major hurricane around 12:00 UTC on June 11. Bud reached its peak intensity as a Category 4 major hurricane, with maximum sustained winds of 140 mph (230 km/h) and a minimum central pressure of 943 mbar (27.85 inHg) at 00:00 UTC on June 12, while located 200 mi (320 km) southwest of Manzanillo, Mexico. Around this time, the cyclone's eye had warmed and become well-defined, but the central dense overcast had been thinning. The hurricane began to weaken soon after, with the northern eyewall of the storm decaying. Soon after, upwelling and cooler sea surface temperatures caused Bud to rapidly weaken. Around midnight UTC on June 13, the hurricane turned towards the north-northwest as it moved around the southern edge of a mid-level high-pressure system. At the same time, Bud had weakened to a minimal Category 2 hurricane. Its eye had dissipated and convection was decreasing in the northern half of the storm.

Bud weakened to a tropical storm by 12:00 UTC on June 13 as its core continued to decay. The storm's intensity soon leveled off, although convection continued to decrease; the remaining banding features were displaced 85 mi (140 km) from Bud's center. The storm made landfall in San Jose del Cabo, Baja California Sur, at 02:00 UTC on June 15 as a 45 mph (72 km/h) tropical storm. Although the cyclone had moved over sharply higher sea surface temperatures as it emerged into the Gulf of California about 9 hours later, interaction with the terrain of Baja California Sur and higher wind shear weakened the system further. The remaining convection was located in a region 115 mi (185 km) north of the center. The mid- and low-level circulations of Bud split apart, with the former traveling quickly to the northeast and the latter over the Gulf of California and northwestern Mexico. The storm lost all of its thunderstorm activity and became a post-tropical cyclone around 12:00 UTC on June 15 while located about 140 mi (230 km) south-southwest of Huatabampito, Mexico. The system continued to weaken and opened up into a trough of low-pressure by 00:00 UTC on June 16, about 35 mi (56 km) southwest of Huatabampito. The remnants of Bud continued northward, bringing moisture to the Southwestern United States.

== Preparations ==
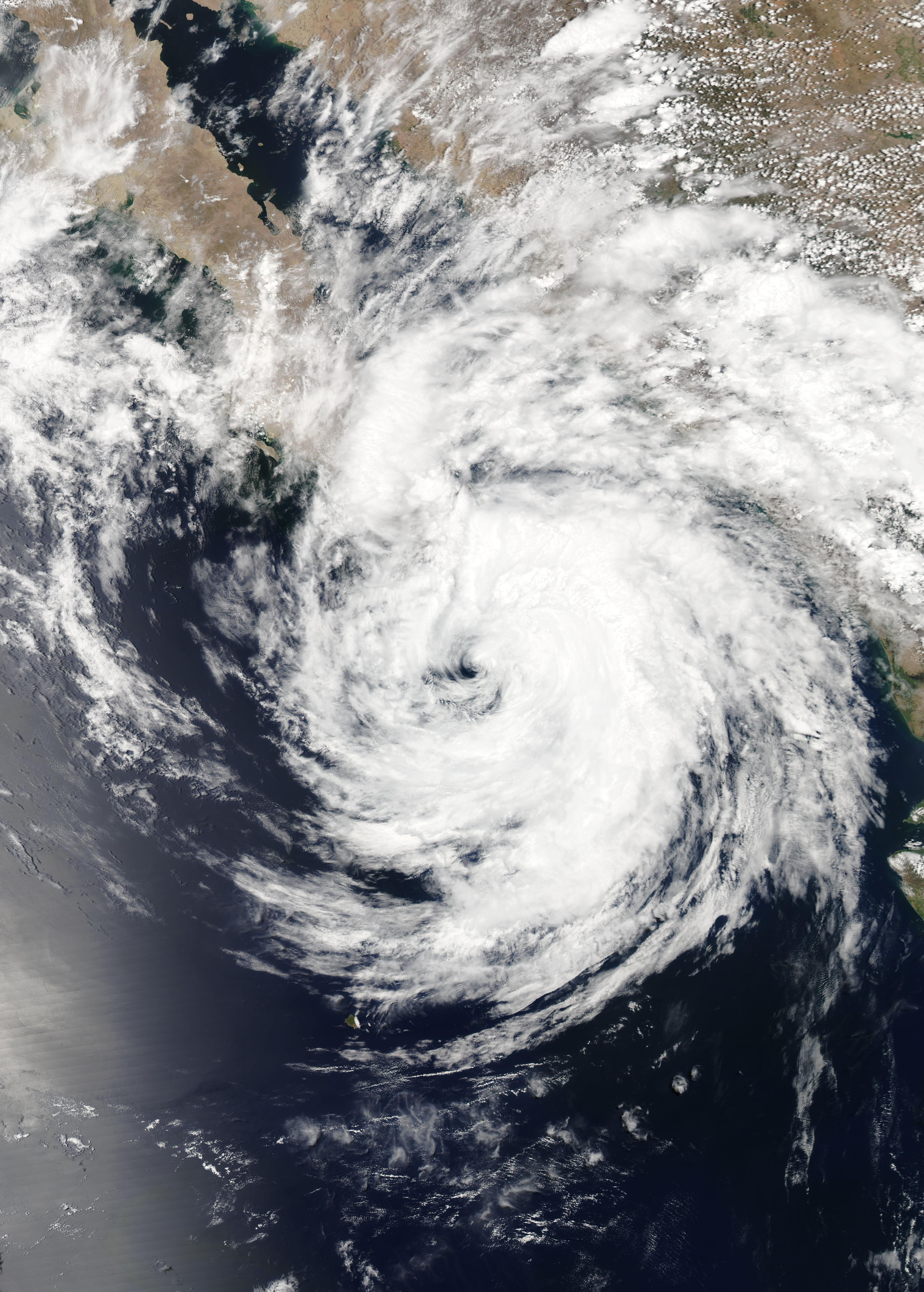
Tropical Storm Bud approaching the Baja California Peninsula on June 14

The Government of Mexico issued various tropical cyclone watches and warnings in advance of the storm. A tropical storm warning was issued for the southwestern coast of Mexico from Manzanillo to Cabo Corrientes, Mexico, around 21:00 UTC on June 10. A tropical storm watch and warning were issued from Santa Fe to La Paz, Baja California Sur, on June 13. Additional tropical storm watches were issued at 21:00 UTC on June 14 from La Paz to San Evaristo in Baja California Sur and Altata to Huatabampito along the Sonoran coast. Green and yellow alerts, signifying low and moderate danger, respectively, were issued for portions of Sinaloa on June 15. A yellow alert was issued for Jalisco. A red alert, signifying the maximum level of danger, was issued for the Los Cabos Municipality. An orange alert, meaning high danger, was raised for La Paz Municipality. Red alerts were issued in the State of Mexico for the Iztapalapa and Cuajimalpa districts due to the threat of torrential, flooding rainfall. Six other districts had orange or yellow alerts.

Admiral Vidal Francisco Soberón Sanz of the Mexican Secretariat of the Navy activated the Prevention Phase of the Marine Plan, a military disaster preparation and relief plan, in the Mexican states of Baja California Sur, Colima, Jalisco, Sinaloa, Nayarit, Michoacán, and Guerrero. The port in Lázaro Cárdenas, Michoacán was closed to all naval traffic. Small craft were to remain docked at ports in San Carlos, Baja California Sur; Manzanillo, Colima; Acapulco, Zihuatanejo, and Puerto Marqués, Guerrero; and Mazatlán, Sinaloa. People were given until noon on June 13 to evacuate their ships from Cabo San Lucas to safer ports in other locations. In Baja California Sur, 280 shelters were established with a combined capacity of 83,500 people. Classes were suspended in Los Cabos and La Paz as a precautionary measure. Medical services were provided at shelters in the Los Cabos municipality by the Mexican and state governments. Numerous shelters were set up in Guerrero, where those affected by the storm could receive food and cleaning supplies. In total, 599 shelters were erected in Guerrero, with the ability to hold 150,000 people. At least 20 flights were canceled at the Los Cabos International Airport. Around 150 people were evacuated from coastal regions in Armería. The Carnival Splendor cruise ship, which was heading for Cabo San Lucas, was forced to divert to San Diego, California. At the Marquis Los Cabos hotel in San Jose del Cabo, employees anchored palm trees to the ground, reinforced windows with tarps, and stored outside furniture.

== Impact ==
Hurricane Bud produced widespread thunderstorms, causing heavy rainfall across much of Mexico. A peak rainfall total of 165 mm (6.50 in) occurred in San Lorenzo, Sinaloa. Approximately 157.6 mm (6.20 in) of rain was recorded in Andrew Weiss, Sinaloa, and 152.6 mm (6.01 in) fell in Alamos, Sonora.

=== Jalisco and Colima ===
Bud caused severe flooding in the state of Jalisco. Rainfall from Bud flooded streets in northern Guadalajara, inundating and/or sweeping away at least 219 vehicles. The Canal de Patria overflowed, flooding streets, as well as the parking lot and first floor of the Plaza Patria mall. People in the mall climbed to higher floors to avoid the flooding. Approximately Mex$1.853 million (US$96,000) of merchandise was damaged and the Marti Sports store suffered over Mex$1 million (US$52,000) in infrastructural damage. A RadioShack lost over Mex$100,000 (US$5,200) worth of products. Another store suffered Mex$500,000 (US$26,200) in lost products. Total damage from the storm in the Plaza Patria mall is unknown. A sinkhole developed at an intersection on Patria Avenue, damaging power lines and traffic lights. The Avila Camacho and Laureles tunnel was closed to traffic after it flooded. At least 94 residences and 27 businesses were damaged by the storm. Water up to 5 m (16 ft) deep completely submerged a light-rail train after an electrical failure prevented the train from reversing. Ninety passengers had to be rescued from the train using lifejackets, surfboards, and boats. Two pumps designed to remove excess water failed due to a power outage. Cleaning operations commenced and one train was removed from the area a day after the flooding occurred; this allowed the station to resume normal traffic. Damage in Jalisco reached Mex$9.1 million (US$473,000).

Plan DN-III-E, a disaster relief and rescue plan, was activated in the state by the Secretariat of National Defense (Sedena). Sedena established shelters and performed cleanup operations in the state. The Mexican Army rescued people who had become entrapped in their vehicles. Several people in Zapopán had to swim through floodwaters in the streets and shopping centers to avoid drowning. A person sustained minor injuries as their vehicle was swept away by floodwaters. The person was rescued and transported to a medical facility for treatment. Personnel from the Parks and Gardens department used chainsaws to clear roads after multiple trees fell and blocked them. A federal highway collapsed in the state following heavy rainfall from Bud.

In Colima, waves swept away chairs, tables, and umbrellas from beaches. Twenty-five businesses that were located on El Paraíso beach in Armería were destroyed; 17 more were half destroyed. Debris accumulated on roads in Armería, causing damage. Power grids, as well as hydraulic and drainage systems, sustained damage. At the Pascuales beach in Tecomán, the front street and businesses flooded. In Manzanillo, street flooding occurred and sewer systems were obstructed. Collectively, four trees fell in the towns of Naranjo, Salagua, Santiago, and Nuevo Cuyutlán. Waves flooded shelters and umbrellas at the La Boquita Beach.

=== Guerrero and Michoacan ===
In Guerrero, Bud damaged 317 grocery stores, flooded 121 homes in the Grande and Chica regions, and damaged six hotels in Acapulco. At least 12 more homes and 50 shelters were damaged elsewhere in the state. The state provided heavy machinery to use for the cleaning and reconstruction of homes and restaurants that had sustained damage during the storm. The Mexican Army initiated Plan DN-III-E to aid people in the Union of Montes de Oca Municipality. Floodwaters inundated residences in the town of Petalco. Soldiers helped citizens move appliances, mattresses, and pets from their homes. State police and the Mexican Army set up temporary shelters in Tecpan de Galeana and La Unión for 100 people who were forced to evacuate due to heavy rainfall and high waves.

Heavy rainfall from Bud caused the waters of the Laguna Negra of Puerto Marques to become contaminated with sewage, which in turn sparked a die-off of at least four fish species. Beaches and coastal towns were damaged by strong waves and torrential rainfall. Soldiers and local workforces cleaned up the debris from these areas. Businessmen in the resort town of Pie de la Cuesta requested that Fonden, the National Disaster Relief Fund, be activated due to the damage sustained as a result of the storm. Approximately 123 businesses suffered losses and infrastructural damage after strong waves compromised the stability of the sand the buildings were on. The waves swept away furniture and almost killed a family after short-circuiting electrical components. Damage in Guerrero totaled Mex$100,000 (US$5,200).

Bud damaged at least 78 businesses along the Jardin, Eréndira, Chuquiapan, Playa Azul, Las Peñas and Caleta beaches in Michoacan. At least 20 palapas, which are open-sided dwellings with thatched roofs made of dried palm leaves, were destroyed at the Jardin and Eréndira beaches. Waves exceeding 4 m (13 ft) and high sea levels damaged the beaches and shelters. Reconstruction work in the area had begun by June 22. Bud washed away the Betula, a Norwegian tanker that had run ashore in 1993; the ship had been a tourist attraction since then. Restaurants located on the beach and homes in Aquila Municipality sustained damage after water from the ocean came 35 m (115 ft) inland. More than sixty homes in the town of Maruata were damaged by floodwaters and winds; the roofs of most were either partially or completely destroyed. People used tarps, plastic sheets, and coconut palm palapas in place of roofs in the months following the storm. A Firm Roof Program was established by the Aquila Municipal Government in the months after Bud to completely cover the costs of replacing all the roofs. The entirety of the ramadas on Maruata beach suffered infrastructural damage as a result of the storm.

=== Elsewhere ===
Waves produced by Bud flooded several homes in Navolato, Sinaloa, causing one to collapse. A palapa near a housing complex sustained damage. Fourteen people had to be evacuated from their homes due to rising floodwaters. A dam in Culiacán reached maximum capacity, prompting authorities to discharge the excess water. Three people had to be rescued after their vehicle became trapped in a strong water current. Several hectare of chop suey crops in Mocorito spoiled after excessive rainfall.

The De la Olla and San Renovato dams overflowed due to excessive rainfall from Bud, causing extensive road flooding and damage throughout the historical district in Guanajuato City, Guanajuato.

In Mexico City, the Collective Transportation System Metro halted service to several stations on its A-Line after roads flooded. The line was fully operational by June 15 after the water was drained at one location by four stationary sump pumps, four mobile pumps, and two emergency teams. Another point was cleared by eight mobile pumps. Utility trucks helped to rescue metro passengers who were stranded in floods. Torrential rains caused flooding on Ermita Iztapalapa road until Ignacio Zaragoza road, inundating dozens of vehicles and entrapping the passengers. Local authorities rescued people from their vehicles. At the intersection of the two roads, a patch of flooding at least 100 m (330 ft) long and 0.3 m (1 ft) deep occurred after raw sewage overflowed from drains. Heavy rainfall from Bud generated currents that swept away a child who was crossing a road in the city.

Bud left behind mostly minor damage in Baja California Sur. The storm caused multiple landslides and flooding on a highway connecting La Paz and Cabo San Lucas. Multiple power outages occurred in La Paz. A traffic accident occurred during the storm, leaving one person dead and two more injured. The ports of San José del Cabo and Cabo San Lucas were closed on June 15, although airports in these cities had reopened.

The remnants of Bud sent a plume of moisture into the Southwestern United States, bringing much-needed rainfall to the drought-stricken region. Tucson, Arizona, reported its first precipitation since February 28, with 0.17 in (4.3 mm) of rain on June 15. Flash flood watches were issued for parts of New Mexico and southwestern Colorado. Strong winds downed power lines in New Mexico. Damage from this incident totaled US$50,000. Around 2 in (51 mm) of rain fell near Cave Creek, Arizona, generating streams of water that crossed over and blocked roadways. Damage from this incident totaled US$2,000. Thunderstorms generated by Bud's remnants produced wind gusts up to 61 mph (98 km/h) at the Taos Regional Airport in New Mexico. Rain from Bud slowed the growth of the 416 Fire in southwestern Colorado and a fire in southern Wyoming.

== See also ==
- Weather of 2018
- Tropical cyclones in 2018
- List of Category 4 Pacific hurricanes
- Other tropical cyclones of the same name
- List of Baja California Peninsula hurricanes
- Hurricane Blanca (2015)
