= Mount Stansfield =

Mountain in Antarctica

Mount Stansfield (/ˈstænsfiːld/ STANSS-feeld; 66°41′S 52°51′E) is a mountain 2.5 nautical miles (4.6 km) southeast of Mount Berrigan and 20 nautical miles (37 km) west-southwest of Stor Hanakken Mountain in Enderby Land. It was plotted from air photos taken from ANARE (Australian National Antarctic Research Expeditions) aircraft in 1957 and was named by the Antarctic Names Committee of Australia (ANCA) for P.B. Stansfield, the supervising radio technician at Wilkes Station in 1961.
