= Budd (given name) =

Budd is a masculine given name. Notable people with the name include:

- Budd Boetticher (1916–2001), film director during the classical period in Hollywood
- R. Budd Dwyer (1939–1987), American politician who committed suicide during a televised press conference
- Budd S. Ford (1840–1879), American politician from Maryland
- Budd Friedman (1932–2022), founder and original proprietor and MC of the Improvisation Comedy Club
- Budd Grossman (1924–2017), American producer and screenwriter
- Budd Hopkins (1931–2011), central figure in abduction phenomenon and related UFO research
- Budd Johnson (1910–1984), jazz saxophonist and clarinetist
- Budd Lynch (1917–2012), Detroit Red Wings' public address announcer at Joe Louis Arena
- Budd Root (born 1958), American cartoonist, and creator of the independent comic book Cavewoman
- Budd Schulberg (1914–2009), American screenwriter, novelist and sports writer

Fictional characters:

- Budd, from the two-part film Kill Bill
