= Bud (nickname) =

Bud is a nickname for:

== In arts and entertainment ==
- William Bud Abbott (1897–1974), American actor/comedian
- Julian Bud Blake (1918–2005), American cartoonist
- Roman Bohnen (1901–1949), American actor
- Bud Collyer (1908–1969), born Clayton Johnson Heermance, Jr., American TV game show host and radio actor
- Bud Cort (1948–2026), born Walter Edward Cox, American actor
- Harry Bud Fisher (1885–1954), originator of the comic strip Mutt and Jeff
- Bud Flanagan (1896–1968), born Chaim Reuben Weintrop, English music hall and vaudeville entertainer
- Lawrence Bud Freeman (1906–1991), American jazz musician, bandleader and composer
- Buddy Bud Green (1897–1981), Austrian-born American songwriter
- Jonah Bud Greenspan (1926–2010), American documentary filmmaker
- A. B. Guthrie, Jr. (1901–1991), American Pulitzer Prize-winning novelist, screenwriter and historian
- William Bud Jamison (1894–1944), American film actor
- Clarence Budington Kelland (1881–1964), American writer and politician
- William Bud Luckey (1934–2018), American cartoonist, animator, singer, musician, composer and voice actor
- Henry David Bud Molin (1925–2007), American film editor and television director
- William Bud Neill (1911–1970), Scottish cartoonist
- Leonard Bud Osborne (1884–1964), American film actor
- Lowell Bud Paxson (1935–2015), American media executive
- Earl Bud Powell (1924–1966), American jazz pianist
- Clifford Bud Shank (1926–2009), American jazz musician
- Bud S. Smith, American film editor
- John Bud Sparhawk (born 1937), American science fiction author
- Bud Spencer (1929–2016), born Carlo Pedersoli, Italian actor, swimmer, and water polo player
- Charles Bud Tingwell (1923–2009), Australian actor
- Clarence Bud Webster (1952–2016), American science fiction and fantasy writer
- George Bud Westmore (1918–1973), Hollywood makeup artist
- Alan Bud Yorkin (1926–2015), American film and television producer and director

== In sports ==
- Kenneth Bud Adams (1923–2013), owner of the Tennessee Titans National Football League franchise
- Harry Bud Black (born 1957), American Major League Baseball manager and retired pitcher
- Robert "Bud" or Buddy Blattner (1920–2009), American baseball player and sportscaster
- Leon Bud Carson (1930–2005), American football coach
- Alexander Bud Cook (1907–1993), Canadian National Hockey League player
- Leavitt Bud Daley (born 1932), American Major League Baseball player
- Grover Bud Delp (1932–2006), American Hall-of-Fame Thoroughbred racehorse trainer
- William Bud Eley (born 1975), American basketball player
- John Bud Fowler (1858–1913), African-American baseball player, field manager and club organizer
- Harry Bud Grant (1927–2023), American athlete and National Football League head coach
- Darrel Bud Harrelson (born 1944), American retired Major League Baseball player
- Borden Bud Korchak (1927–2010), Canadian football player
- Robert Bud Moore (American football) (born 1939), American football player and coach
- Walter Bud Moore (NASCAR owner) (1925–2017), former NASCAR owner
- Paul Bud Moore (racing driver) (1940–2017), former NASCAR driver
- David Bud Norris (born 1985), American Major League Baseball pitcher
- Carlos Bud Ogden (born 1946), American retired college and National Basketball Association player
- John Bud Palmer (1921–2013), American basketball player and sportscaster
- Norman Bud Poile (1924–2005), Canadian National Hockey League player, coach, general manager and league executive; member of the Hockey Hall of Fame
- Bud Schwenk (1917–1980), American professional football quarterback
- Bud Schultz (born 1959), American retired tennis player
- Allan Bud Selig (born 1934), Commissioner of Major League Baseball
- Charlies Bud Taylor (1903–1962), American bantamweight boxer
- Frank Bud Taylor (golfer) (1916–1991), American amateur golfer
- Charles Bud Wilkinson (1916–1994), American college football head coach

== Politicians ==
- Joseph Bud Boyce (1924–1984), Canadian politician
- Clarence Bud Brown (politician) (1927–2022), American politician
- Melville Bud Germa (1920—1993), Canadian politician
- Horace Bud Olson (1925–2002), Canadian businessman and politician
- Louis Bud Sherman (1926–2015), Canadian politician
- Elmer Bud Shuster (1932–2023), American politician
- Charles Bud Wildman (born 1946), Canadian politician

== Other ==
- Arthur Bud Collins (1929–2016), American journalist and television commentator
- George Bud Day (1925–2013), US Air Force colonel, pilot and Medal of Honor recipient
- Wilson Flagg (1938–2001), US Navy rear admiral
- Bernard Bud Konheim (1935–2019), American fashion businessman
- Walker Bud Mahurin (1918–2010), US Air Force World War II ace
- James I. Robertson Jr. (1930–2019), American historian
- Edwin Bud Shrake (1931–2009), American journalist, sportswriter, novelist, biographer and screenwriter
- James Bud Walton (1921–1995), co-founder of Wal-Mart and brother of Sam Walton

== See also ==
- Buddy (nickname)
