= Mount Berrigan =

Mountain in Enderby Land, Antarctica

Coordinates: 66°40′S 52°43′E

Mount Berrigan is a mountain 1 nautical mile (1.9 km) east of Budd Peak in Enderby Land. It was plotted from air photos taken from ANARE (Australian National Antarctic Research Expeditions) aircraft in 1957. It was named by the Antarctic Names Committee of Australia (ANCA) for M.G. Berrigan, assistant diesel mechanic at Wilkes Station in 1961.

== See also ==
- Mount Stansfield
