= James T. Earle =

American politician from Maryland

James Tilghman Earle

President pro tempore of the Maryland Senate
- In office 1867–1867
- Preceded by: Charles H. Ohr
- Succeeded by: Barnes Compton

Member of the Maryland Senate from the Queen Anne's County district
- In office 1865–1875
- Succeeded by: Budd S. Ford

Personal details
- Born: July 30, 1814 Winton, Maryland
- Died: July 1, 1882 (aged 67) Queen Anne's County, Maryland
- Party: Democratic
- Education: Harvard College (BA)

James T. Earle (July 30, 1814 – July 1882) was an American politician who served in the Maryland Senate representing the Queen Anne's County district from 1865 to 1875. He also served as President pro tempore of the Maryland Senate in 1867.
