= Budd Lake (Clearwater County, Minnesota) =

Lake in the state of Minnesota, United States

- Location within Minnesota Location within the United States
- Location: Clearwater County, Minnesota
- Coordinates: 47°10′N 95°10.5′W
- Type: Lake
- Surface elevation: 1,568 feet (478 m)

Budd Lake is a lake in Clearwater County, Minnesota, in the United States.

According to Warren Upham, Budd Lake was named "after an Ohio family name".

== See also ==
- List of lakes in Minnesota
