= Buddy (nickname) =

Buddy is the nickname of:

== In arts and entertainment ==
- Buddy Baker (composer) (1918–2002), American composer
- Buddy Bolden (1877–1931), American jazz cornetist
- Buddy Bregman (1930–2017), American arranger and producer
- Buddy Buie (1941–2015), American songwriter and record producer
- Buddy Clark (1912–1949), American pop singer
- Buddy DeFranco (1923–2014), American jazz clarinetist
- Buddy Deppenschmidt (1936–2021), American jazz drummer
- Buddy DeSylva (1895–1950), American songwriter, record executive, and film producer
- Buddy Ebsen (1908–2003), American actor and dancer best known for his role in The Beverly Hillbillies
- Buddy Emmons (1937–2015), American country guitarist
- A. Arnold Gillespie (1899–1978), American cinema special effects artist
- Buddy Greco (1926–2017), American jazz and pop singer and pianist
- Buddy Guy (born 1936), American blues guitarist and singer
- Buddy Hackett (1924–2003), American actor and comedian
- Buddy Holly (1936–1959), American pioneering rock and roll singer, songwriter, and musician
- Buddy Johnson (1915–1977), American musician
- Buddy Kaye (1918–2002), American songwriter
- Buddy Lester (1915–2002), American comedian and actor
- Buddy Miles (1947–2008), American rock and funk drummer
- Buddy Rich (1917–1987), American jazz drummer and bandleader
- Charles "Buddy" Rogers (1904–1999), American actor and jazz musician
- Buddy Stewart (1922–1950), American jazz singer
- Buddy Valastro (born 1977), American celebrity chef, star of the TLC show Cake Boss

== In sports ==
- Buddy Alexander (born 1953), American college golf head coach and former amateur golfer
- Buddy Allin (1944–2007), American professional golfer
- Buddy Baer (1915–1986), American boxer
- Buddy Baker (1941–2015), American NASCAR driver
- Buddy Bell (born 1951), American Major League Baseball player and manager
- Buddy Blattner (1920–2009), American Major League Baseball player, world champion table tennis doubles player and sportscaster
- Buddy Boeheim (born 1999), American basketball player
- Buddy Boshers (born 1988), American Major League Baseball pitcher
- Buddy Burris (1923–2007), American college and National Football League player
- Buddy Daye (1928–1995), Canadian boxer
- Buddy Dear (1905–1989), American Major League Baseball player
- Buddy Franklin (born 1987), Australian rules footballer
- Buddy Gardner (born 1955), American professional golfer
- Buddy Gordon (born 1987), Australian rugby league footballer
- Buddy Groom (born 1965), American former Major League Baseball pitcher
- Buddy Hall (born 1945), American professional pool player
- Buddy Hield (born 1993), Bahamian basketball player
- Buddy Howell (born 1996), American football player
- Buddy Jackson (born 1989), American football player
- Buddy Johnson (American football) (born 1999), American football player
- Buddy Landel (1961–2015), American professional wrestler
- Buddy Lively (1925–2015), American former Major League Baseball pitcher
- Buddy Matthews (born 1988), Australian professional wrestler
- Buddy Murphy (born 1988), ring name of Australian professional wrestler Matthew Adams
- Buddy Myer (1904–1974), American Major League Baseball player
- Hub Pernoll (1888–1944), American baseball pitcher
- Buddy Rogers (wrestler) (1921–1992), American professional wrestler
- Buddy Ryan (1931–2016), American football coach
- Buddy Wayne (1967–2017), American professional wrestler
- Buddy Young (1926–1983), American football player and executive

== In the military ==
- Lee Archer (pilot) (1919–2010), African-American World War II flying ace, member of the Tuskegee Airmen and lieutenant colonel
- Charles R. Long (1923–1951), American Korean War sergeant and Medal of Honor recipient
- Horace M. Thorne (1918–1944), American World War II soldier and Medal of Honor recipient
- Gene Arden Vance Jr. (1963–2002), American soldier killed in action in Afghanistan

== In politics ==
- Buddy Cianci (1941–2016), longtime mayor of Providence, Rhode Island
- George Darden (born 1943), American politician
- Buddy Dyer (born 1958), mayor of Orlando, Florida
- Buddy Roemer (1943–2021), American former congressman, Louisiana governor and independent presidential candidate

== In other fields ==
- Buddy Justus (1952–1990), American spree killer
- William Moore (steamship captain) (1822–1909), German-born steamship captain, businessman, miner and explorer in British Columbia and Alaska
- J. C. Nicholson (born 1942), American judge
- Pat Nixon (1912–1993), wife of former President Richard M. Nixon; nickname in high school yearbook

== See also ==
- Ferenc Puskás (1927–2006), renowned Hungarian footballer nicknamed Öcsi (Buddy)
- Bud (nickname)
- The Secret Life Of Pets
