= List of storms named Bud =

The name Bud has been used for nine tropical cyclones in the Eastern Pacific Ocean.

- Tropical Storm Bud (1978), did not affect land.
- Tropical Storm Bud (1982), weak, short-lived tropical storm.
- Tropical Storm Bud (1988), dissipated near the south Mexican coastline.
- Tropical Storm Bud (1994), weak, short-lived tropical storm.
- Tropical Storm Bud (2000), paralleled the southwest coast of Mexico.
- Hurricane Bud (2006), a Category 3 hurricane that did not affect land.
- Hurricane Bud (2012), a Category 3 hurricane that approached Western Mexico.
- Hurricane Bud (2018), a Category 4 hurricane that brushed the Baja California Peninsula as a tropical storm.
- Tropical Storm Bud (2024), moderate tropical storm, did not affect land.
