= Bud Konheim =

American businessman (1935–2019)

- Born: Bernard Brand Konheim; March 25, 1935; New York City, U.S.
- Died: April 13, 2019 (aged 84); Norwalk, Connecticut, U.S.
- Education: Phillips Exeter Academy
- Alma mater: Dartmouth College
- Occupation: Businessman

Bernard Brand "Bud" Konheim (March 25, 1935 – April 13, 2019) was an American businessman. He was the co-founder and chief executive officer of Nicole Miller, a fashion company.

== Early life ==
Bud Konheim was educated at Phillips Exeter Academy. He graduated from Dartmouth College and served in the Marines.

== Career ==
Konheim co-founded Nicole Miller, a fashion company. He served as its chief executive officer.

== Personal life ==
Konheim's son Eric died in a kayaking accident in 1991.

in 2015, Konheim made major gifts to Rocky Mountain Institute (in honor of his son Eric) and Puppies Behind Bars (to aid returning veterans with PTSD). He also donated money in support of student scholarships at Phillips Exeter Academy and Dartmouth College.

Konheim died from injuries sustained from falling off of his bicycle on April 13, 2019.
