= Budd Lake (Martin County, Minnesota) =

Lake in the state of Minnesota, United States

- Location within Minnesota Location within the United States
- Location: Martin County, Minnesota
- Coordinates: 43°38′24″N 94°28′0″W
- Type: Lake
- Surface elevation: 1,152 feet (351 m)

Budd Lake is a lake in Martin County, in the U.S. state of Minnesota.

Budd Lake was named for William H. Budd, a local historian who settled there.

== See also ==
- List of lakes in Minnesota
