= East Budd Island =

Island in Antarctica

Coordinates: 67°35′S 62°51′E

East Budd Island is the eastern of two larger islands at the north end of the Flat Islands in Holme Bay, Mac. Robertson Land, Antarctica. It was mapped by Norwegian cartographers from air photos taken by the Lars Christensen Expedition, 1936–37, who named the northern islands "Flatoynalane" (the flat island needles). This island was named by the Antarctic Names Committee of Australia for Dr. G.M. Budd, a medical officer at Mawson Station in 1959.

== See also ==
- List of Antarctic and sub-Antarctic islands
