= Budding (surname) =

Budding is a surname. Notable people with the surname include:

- Edwin Beard Budding (1795–1846), English inventor
- Martijn Budding (born 1995), Dutch cyclist
- Richard Budding (born 1957), Dutch footballer
