= Bud, Indiana =

- Unincorporated community
- Location within Indiana Location within the United States
- Coordinates: 39°26′49″N 86°10′33″W
- Country: United States
- State: Indiana
- County: Johnson
- Township: Union
- Elevation: 830 ft (250 m)
- ZIP code: 46131
- FIPS code: 18-08884
- GNIS feature ID: 431757

Bud is an unincorporated community in Union Township, Johnson County, Indiana.

== History ==
A post office was established at Bud in 1889, and remained in operation until it was discontinued in 1902. The community was named for a storekeeper's son, Bud Vandivier.
