= Bud (surname) =

Bud is a Romanian surname. Notable people with the surname include:

- Cristian Bud (born 1985), Romanian footballer
- Tit Bud (1846–1917), Romanian priest, author, folklorist, translator, historian, and aristocrat
