= Budd S. Ford =

American politician (1840–1879)

Member of the Maryland Senate from the Queen Anne's County district
- In office 1876–1878
- Preceded by: James T. Earle
- Succeeded by: William T. P. Turpin

Member of the Maryland House of Delegates from the Queen Anne's County district
- In office 1872–1874 Serving with Roderick W. Eareckson
- Preceded by: John B. Brown and Joel Thomas
- Succeeded by: Thomas H. Kemp and J. West Thompson Jr.

Personal details
- Born: March 2, 1840 Salem, New Jersey, U.S.
- Died: July 20, 1879 (aged 39) Ocean City, Maryland, U.S.
- Resting place: North East Methodist Cemetery
- Party: Democratic
- Spouse: Emily Hendricks (m. 1862; died 1868)
- Children: 2
- Occupation: Politician; businessman

Budd S. Ford (March 2, 1840 – July 20, 1879) was an American politician from Maryland. He served as a member of the Maryland House of Delegates, representing Queen Anne's County, from 1872 to 1874. He also served as a member of the Maryland Senate from 1876 to 1878.

== Early life ==
Budd S. Ford was born on March 2, 1840, in Salem, New Jersey, to Catharine (née Wright) and Charles T. Ford. His father was a clergyman with the Methodist Episcopal Church. He attended Pennington Academy. At the age of 14, he worked as a clerk at a wholesale drug store.

== Career ==
Ford moved west and lived in Ohio. He then moved to Maryland and worked as a clerk on a steamer on Chester River. He stayed in that role until 1860 and then worked as captain of the steamer until 1862.

After marrying in 1862, Ford moved to Queen Anne's County, Maryland. He organized the Chester River Steamboat Stock Company and served as president and general business manager. The company built the steamer B. S. Ford to work between Baltimore and Chestertown. It was named after Ford. They also owned one or two other steamers.

Ford was a Democrat. He served as a member of the Maryland House of Delegates, representing Queen Anne's County, from 1872 to 1874. He also served as a member of the Maryland Senate, representing Queen Anne's County, from 1876 to 1878. He served as a member of Governor James Black Groome's staff.

== Personal life ==
Ford married Emily Hendricks of Queen Anne's County in 1862. His wife died in 1868. They had two daughters, Emma H. and Catharine Ford. He was affianced with Alice Emory.

Ford drowned on July 20, 1879, in Ocean City, Maryland. He was buried at the North East Methodist Cemetery.
