= Budd Peak (Enderby Land) =

Mountain in Antarctica

Coordinates: 66°40′S 52°40′E

Budd Peak is a peak 1 mile (1.6 km) west of Mount Berrigan and 23 miles (37 km) west-southwest of Stor Hanakken Mountain in Enderby Land. It was plotted from air photos taken from Australian National Antarctic Research Expeditions aircraft in 1957, and named by the Antarctic Names Committee of Australia for W. Budd, glaciologist at Wilkes Station in 1961.
