= Shield budding =

Type of grafting used with fruit trees

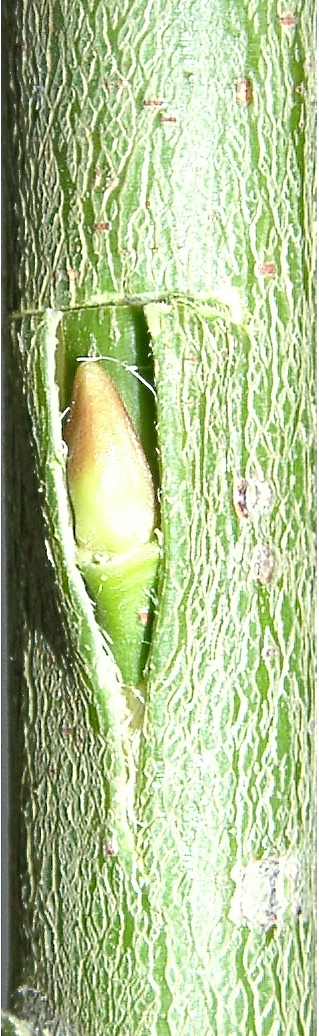
T budding

Shield budding, also known as T-budding, is a technique of grafting to change varieties of fruit trees. Typically used in fruit tree propagation, it can also be used for many other kinds of nursery stock. An extremely sharp knife is necessary; specialty budding knives are on the market. A budding knife is a small knife with a type of spatula at the other end of the handle. The rootstock or stock plant may be cut off above the bud at budding, or one may wait until it is certain that the bud is growing.

Fruit tree budding is done when the bark "slips," i.e. the cambium is moist and actively growing. Rootstocks are young trees, either seedlings as Mazzard cherries for many cherry varieties, or clonal rootstocks (usually propagated by layering) when one wants highly consistent plants with well defined characteristics. The popular Malling-Merton series of rootstocks for apples was developed in England, and are used today for the majority of the commercial apple orchard trees.

T-budding is the most common style, whereby a T-shaped slit is made in the stock plant, and the knife is flexed from side to side in the lower slit to loosen up the bark. Scion wood is selected from the chosen variety, as young, actively growing shoots. Usually, buds at the tip, or at the older parts of the shoot are discarded, and only two to four buds are taken for use. The buds are in the leaf axils. They may be so tiny as to be almost unnoticeable.

Holding the petiole of the leaf as a handle, an oval of the main stem is sliced off, including the petiole and the bud. This is immediately slid into the T on the rootstock, before it can dry out. The joined bud and rootstock are held by a winding of rubber band, which will hold it until sealed, but the band will deteriorate in the sunlight so it soon breaks and does not pinch new growth, girdling the shoot.

The percentage of "take" of the buds depends on the natural compatibility of the stock and scion, the sharpness of the knife, and the skill of the budder; even the experts will have some buds die.
