= Budd Peak (Heard Island) =

Mountain on Heard Island

Budd Peak (53°7′S 73°33′E) is a peak, 2,315 metres (7,600 ft) high, 1.7 nautical miles (3.1 km) southeast of Mawson Peak on Heard Island. The peak was mapped by Australian National Antarctic Research Expeditions (ANARE) in 1948, and named by the Antarctic Names Committee of Australia for G.M. Budd, ANARE officer-in-charge on Heard Island in 1954, and leader of the 1963 ANARE Heard Island expedition.
