= Timeline of the 2018 Pacific typhoon season =

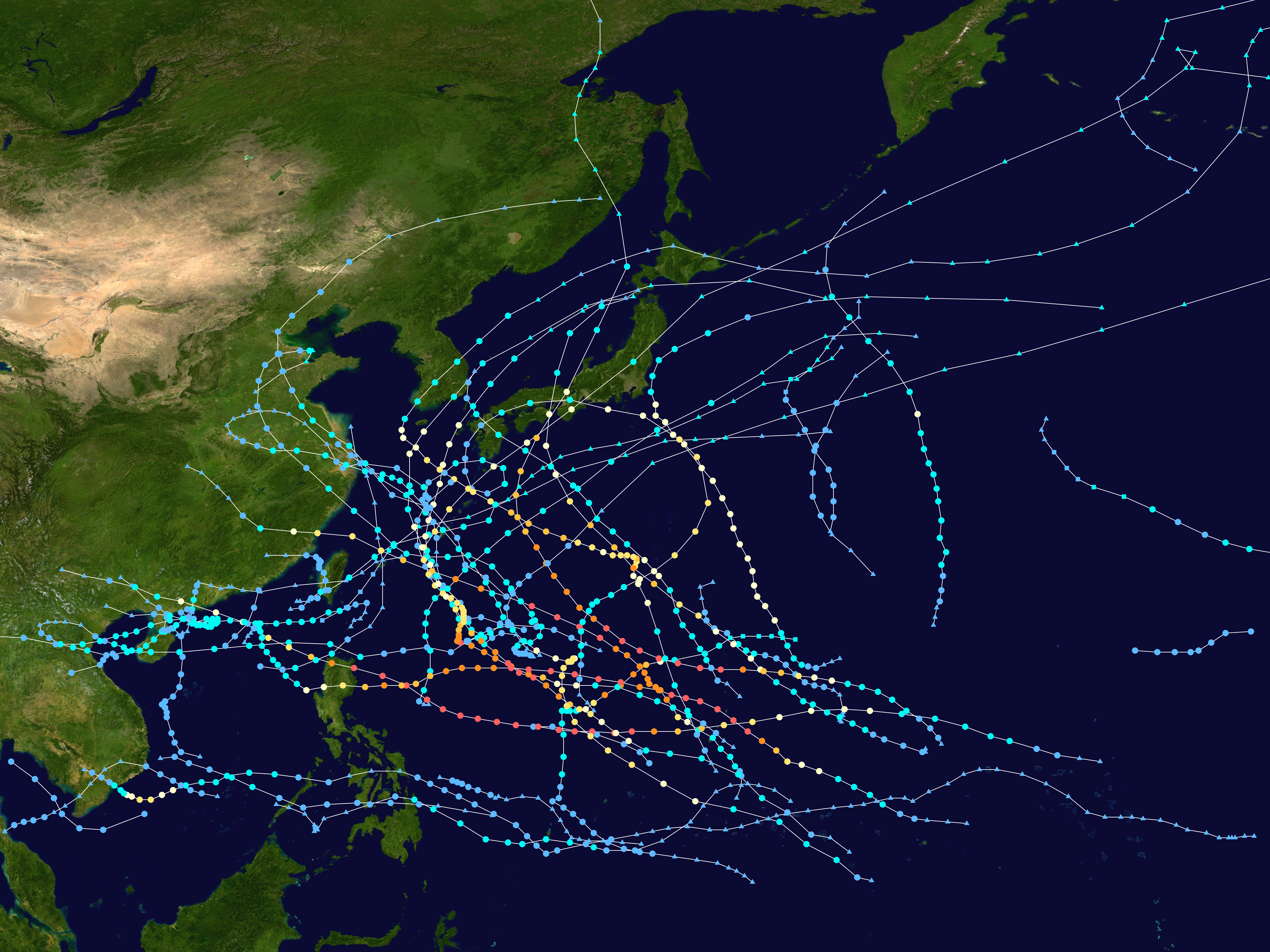
- Season summary map

Season boundaries
- First system formed: December 29, 2017
- Last system dissipated: December 29, 2018 (Note: While Pabuk formed during the 2018 season as being the last system, it was considered to be part of the 2019 Pacific typhoon season, based on the JMA's annual report, thus, 35W (Usman) would be the last system of this season while Pabuk would be the first system for the following season.)

Strongest system
- Name: Kong-rey & Yutu
- Maximum winds: 215 km/h (130 mph) (10-minute sustained)
- Lowest pressure: 900 hPa (mbar)

Longest lasting system
- Name: Usagi
- Duration: 14 days
Storm articles
- Tropical Storm Bolaven (2018)
- Tropical Storm Sanba (2018)
- Typhoon Jelawat (2018)
- Tropical Storm Ewiniar (2018)
- Tropical Storm Maliksi (2018)
- Typhoon Prapiroon (2018)
- Typhoon Maria (2018)
- Tropical Storm Son-Tinh (2018)
- Tropical Storm Ampil
- Tropical Depression Josie
- Typhoon Jongdari
- Tropical Storm Yagi (2018)
- Tropical Storm Bebinca (2018)
- Hurricane Hector (2018)
- Tropical Storm Rumbia
- Typhoon Soulik (2018)
- Typhoon Cimaron (2018)
- Typhoon Jebi (2018)
- Typhoon Mangkhut
- Tropical Storm Barijat
- Typhoon Trami
- Typhoon Kong-rey (2018)
- Typhoon Yutu
- Tropical Storm Usagi (2018)
- Tropical Storm Toraji (2018)
- Tropical Depression Usman

The 2018 Pacific typhoon season was formerly the costliest Pacific typhoon season on record before being surpassed by the following year and 2023. The season had no official boundaries, and storms can form year-round. Despite this, activity usually peaks between May and November. The season featured above-average activity, with 29 named storms, 13 typhoons, and 7 super typhoons forming in the West Pacific. (Note: Super typhoons are an unofficial classification given by the Joint Typhoon Warning Center for storms whose strength are 130 knots (240 km/h; 150 mph) or above.) The season's first named storm, Bolaven, developed on January 3, while the season's last named storm, Man-yi, dissipated on November 28. The season's first typhoon, Jelawat, reached typhoon status on March 29, eventually becoming the first super typhoon the next day.

This timeline documents all of the events of the 2018 Pacific typhoon season. Most of the tropical cyclones form between May and November. The scope of this article is limited to the Pacific Ocean, north of the equator between 100°E and the International Date Line. The Japan Meteorological Agency (JMA) is the official Regional Specialized Meteorological Centre for the Western Pacific Basin. As such, it is responsible for assigning names to all tropical cyclones that reach 10-minute maximum sustained winds of at least 65 kilometres per hour (40 mph) in the region. The Joint Typhoon Warning Center (JTWC) also monitors systems in the Western Pacific Basin, assigning systems a number with a "W" suffix if the system is a tropical depression or stronger. PAGASA also assigns local names to tropical depressions or stronger storms that form within or enter their area of responsibility, regardless if the JMA has assigned the cyclone a name; however, these names are not in common use outside of PAGASA's area of responsibility. In this season, 21 systems entered or formed in the Philippine Area of Responsibility (PAR), of which 7 of them made landfall over the Philippines.

== Timeline ==
=== January ===
January 1

- 00:00 UTC
  - The 2018 Pacific typhoon season officially begins, with an active tropical depression near the Caroline Islands, a holdover from the 2017 Pacific typhoon season.
  - (08:00 PHT) at 8.7°N 129.9°E – The PAGASA names the tropical depression as Agaton as it traverses westward towards Mindanao.
- 06:00 UTC at 8.7°N 128.4°E – The JMA assesses Agaton has deepened to its minimum central pressure of 1,002 hPa (1,002 mbar; 29.59 inHg) before slightly rising again.
- 12:00 UTC at 9.3°N 126.4°E – The JTWC begins tracking Agaton, designating it 01W.
- Before 15:00 UTC (23:00 PHT) at 9.6°N 125.7°E – 01W (Agaton) makes its first landfall on Claver, Surigao del Norte.
- 21:00 UTC (05:00 PHT, January 2) at 9.5°N 123.5°E – 01W (Agaton) makes its second landfall on the southern portion of Cebu.

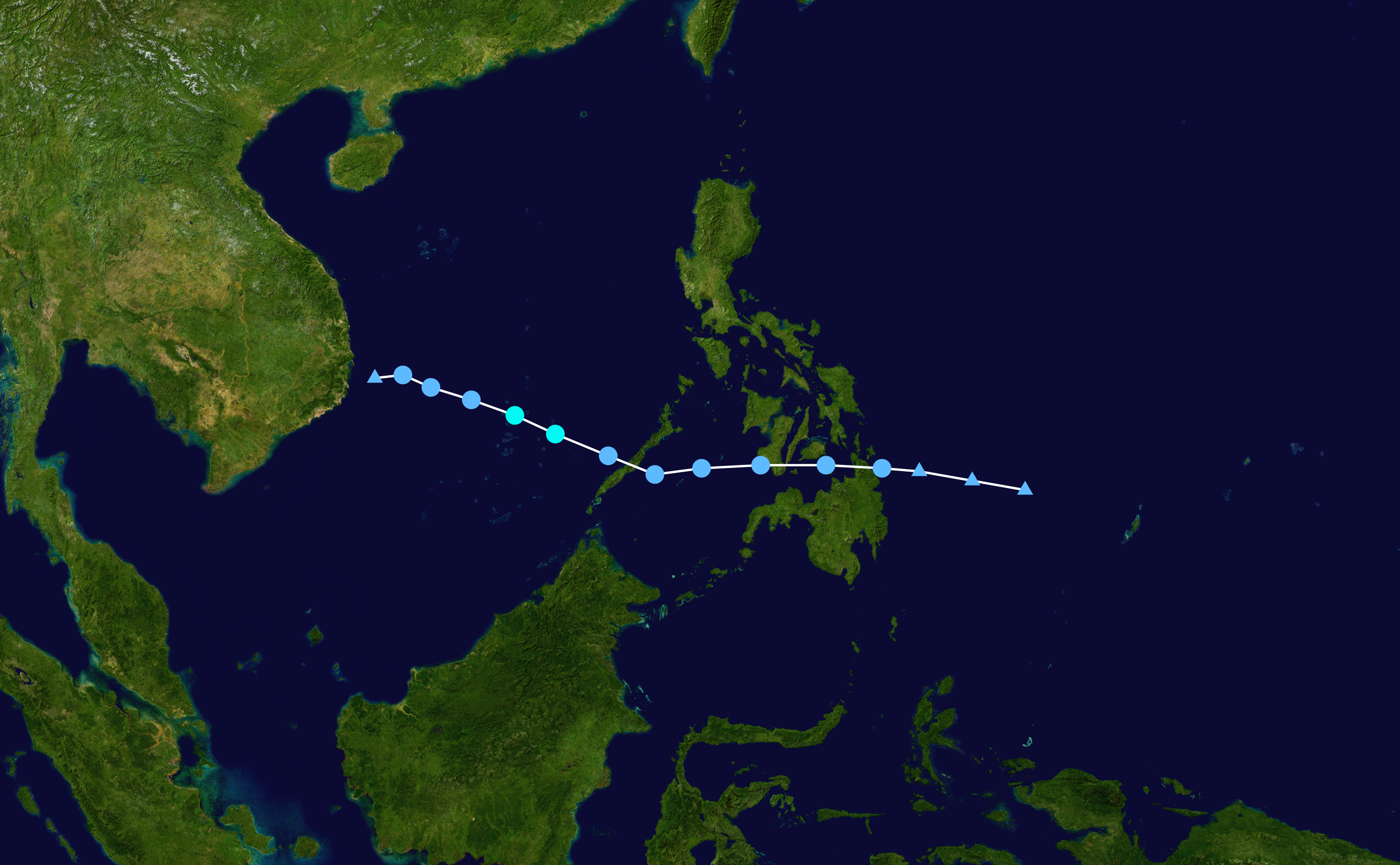
Track of Bolaven during early January.

January 2

- 00:00 UTC (08:00 PHT) at 9.4°N 122.4°E – 01W (Agaton) emerges over the Sulu Sea after making its third landfall on Negros Island.
- Around 14:00 UTC (22:00 PHT) at 9.4°N 118.5°E – 01W (Agaton) makes its fourth and final landfall on Aborlan, Palawan.

January 3

- 00:00 UTC
  - At 10.4°N 116.0°E – The JMA upgrades 01W (Agaton) to a tropical storm, assigning it the name Bolaven, estimating it has peaked in intensity with 10-minute maximum sustained winds of 35 knots (65 km/h; 40 mph) and a minimum central pressure of 1,002 hPa (1,002 mbar; 29.59 inHg).
  - At 10.4°N 115.9°E – The JTWC also upgrades Bolaven (Agaton) to a tropical storm, with 1-minute sustained winds of 35 knots (65 km/h; 40 mph) and a minimum central pressure of 1,001 hPa (1,001 mbar; 29.56 inHg).
  - (08:00 PHT) at 10.6°N 116.0°E – PAGASA follows suit, upgrading Bolaven (Agaton) to a tropical storm, with 10-minute sustained winds of 35 knots (65 km/h; 40 mph) and a minimum central pressure of 1,002 hPa (1,002 mbar; 29.59 inHg).
- Around 06:00 UTC (14:00 PHT) at 11.1°N 114.8°E – PAGASA reports Bolaven (Agaton) has exited the PAR.
- 12:00 UTC at 11.5°N 113.2°E – The JTWC downgrades Bolaven to a tropical depression as it traverses west-northwest over the South China Sea.

January 4

- 00:00 UTC at 12.3°N 111.0°E – The JMA also downgrades Bolaven to a tropical depression as it nears Vietnam.
- 06:00 UTC
  - At 12.3°N 110.0°E – The JMA last notes Tropical Depression Bolaven as it dissipates while moving westward, with the system fully dissipating six hours later.
  - At 12.2°N 110.1°E – The JTWC last notes Bolaven as the system had weakened to a tropical disturbance.

=== February ===
February 8

- 00:00 UTC at 8.1°N 150.8°E – The JMA marks a tropical depression near Chuuk State.
- 06:00 UTC at 9.1°N 150.1°E – The JMA assesses that the tropical depression near Chuuk has attained a central pressure of 1,004 hPa (1,004 mbar; 29.65 inHg) before slightly rising again.
- 18:00 UTC at 11.0°N 148.6°E – The tropical depression near Chuuk re-attained a central pressure of 1,004 hPa (1,004 mbar; 29.65 inHg) as it turns to the west-southwest.

February 9

- 06:00 UTC at 10.1°N 146.9°E – The tropical depression's central pressure continues to fluctuate as it slightly deepens to 1,004 hPa (1,004 mbar; 29.65 inHg) while moving to the southeast of Guam.
- 18:00 UTC at 9.1°N 145.0°E – The tropical depression's central pressure slightly deepens to 1,006 hPa (1,006 mbar; 29.71 inHg) after a brief rise while located south of Guam.

February 10

- 12:00 UTC at 6.4°N 140.0°E – The JTWC designates the tropical depression now east of Palau as 02W.

February 11

- 00:00 UTC at 6.6°N 137.4°E – The JTWC upgrades 02W to a tropical storm.
- 06:00 UTC at 6.8°N 135.8°E – The JMA upgrades 02W to a tropical storm, assigning it the name Sanba, assessing it has peaked in intensity with 10-minute winds of 35 knots (65 km/h; 40 mph) and a minimum central pressure of 1,000 hPa (1,000 mbar; 29.53 inHg) while moving towards Palau.
- Around 11:00 UTC (19:00 PHT) – PAGASA reports Sanba has entered the PAR and assigned the system Basyang with the agency assessing it with 10-minute winds of 35 knots (65 km/h; 40 mph) and a minimum central pressure of 1,000 hPa (1,000 mbar; 29.53 inHg).
- 12:00 UTC at 7.1°N 134.4°E – The JTWC assesses that Sanba (Basyang) has peaked in intensity, with 1-minute winds of 40 knots (74 km/h; 46 mph) and a minimum central pressure of 999 hPa (999.0 mbar; 29.50 inHg) as the system is about to hit Palau.
- Between 12:00 - 13:00 UTC (21:00 - 22:00 PWT) at 7.0°N 134.3°E – Tropical Storm Sanba (Basyang) hits the island of Peleliu in southern Palau.

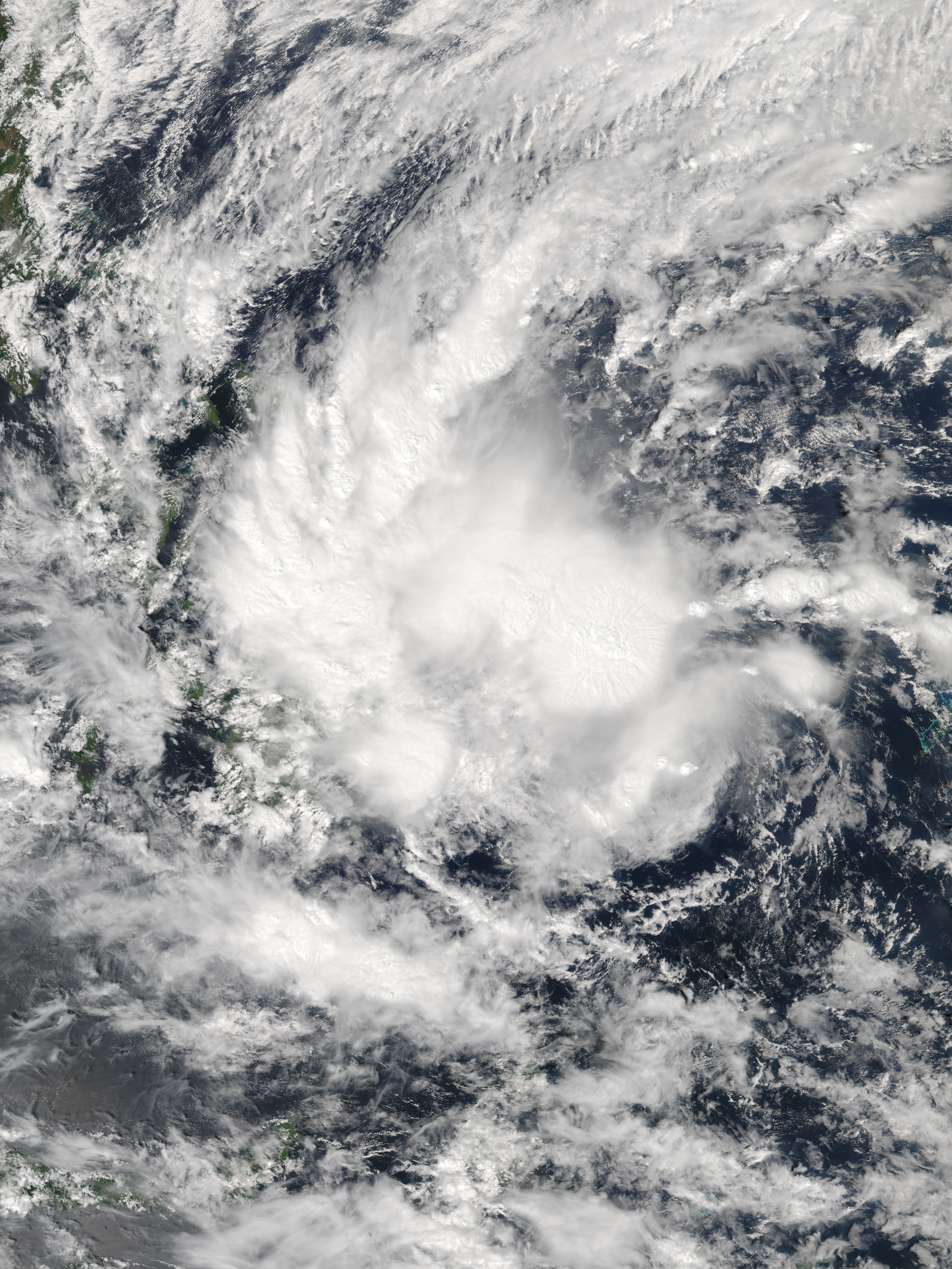
Sanba approaching Mindanao on February 12.

February 12

- 18:00 UTC at 9.0°N 127.3°E – The JTWC assesses Sanba (Basyang)'s central pressure slightly deepens to 1,002 hPa (1,002 mbar; 29.59 inHg) as it moves west-northwestwards towards northeastern Mindanao.

February 13

- 00:00 UTC (08:00 PHT) at 9.4°N 126.5°E – PAGASA downgrades Sanba (Basyang) to a tropical depression as it is about to make landfall.
- Between 00:00 - 03:00 UTC (08:00 - 11:00 PHT) at 9.7°N 125.9°E and 9.7°N 125.6°E – Tropical Storm Sanba (Basyang) crosses the southern portion of Bucas Grande Island before making landfall on Placer, Surigao del Norte.
- 06:00 UTC
  - At 9.6°N 124.6°E – The JMA also downgrades Sanba (Basyang) to a tropical depression as it emerges over the Bohol Sea.
  - At 9.8°N 124.9°E – The JTWC also downgrades Sanba (Basyang) to a tropical depression as it turns to the west-southwest again.
- Between 11:00 - 13:00 UTC (19:00 - 21:00 PHT) at 9.2°N 123.5°E – Tropical Depression Sanba (Basyang) crosses the province of Siquijor.
- 18:00 UTC at 8.8°N 121.8°E – The JTWC downgrades Sanba to a tropical wave after emerging over the Sulu Sea.

February 14

- 18:00 UTC
  - At 7.2°N 120.0°E – The JMA assesses Sanba (Basyang)'s central pressure at 1,008 hPa (1,008 mbar; 29.77 inHg) before rising again as the system moves northwestward.
  - At 7.8°N 119.9°E – The JTWC assesses that Sanba (Basyang) re-strengthened into a tropical depression with 1-minute winds of 25 knots (46 km/h; 29 mph) and a minimum central pressure of 1,006 hPa (1,006 mbar; 29.71 inHg).
  - (02:00 PHT, February 15) at 7.2°N 119.9°E – PAGASA also assesses Sanba (Basyang)'s central pressure at 1,008 hPa (1,008 mbar; 29.77 inHg) as the system turns towards Palawan.

February 15

- 00:00 UTC at 8.0°N 119.8°E – The JTWC downgrades Sanba (Basyang) into a tropical disturbance as it further weakens.
- 06:00 UTC
  - At 8.7°N 119.2°E – Sanba (Basyang)'s central pressure drops back to 1,008 hPa (1,008 mbar; 29.77 inHg) per the JMA.
  - (14:00 PHT, February 15) at 8.6°N 119.2°E – PAGASA also reports Sanba (Basyang) re-attains a central pressure of 1,008 hPa (1,008 mbar; 29.77 inHg) as the system is about to make landfall.
- 14:00 UTC (22:00 PHT) – Sanba (Basyang) makes its final landfall at the border of Narra and Sofronio Española towns, Palawan.

February 16

- 00:00 UTC (08:00 PHT) at 10.0°N 116.0°E – PAGASA downgrades Sanba (Basyang) to a low-pressure area now over the South China Sea.
- 06:00 UTC at 9.8°N 115.7°E – The JMA assesses Sanba attaining a pressure drop of 1,010 hPa (1,010 mbar; 29.83 inHg) as the system decays.
- 12:00 UTC – Sanba weakens and dissipates to a low-pressure area.

=== March ===
March 24

- 18:00 UTC at 5.8°N 143.0°E – The JMA begins tracking a tropical depression near the Caroline Islands.

March 25

- 00:00 UTC at 6.2°N 141.1°E – The JTWC designates the tropical depression near the Caroline Islands as 03W with 1-minute winds of 30 knots (56 km/h; 35 mph) and a central pressure of 1,000 hPa (1,000 mbar; 29.53 inHg).
- 06:00 UTC at 6.6°N 140.3°E – The JMA upgrades 03W to a tropical storm, assigning it the name Jelawat while moving northwestward.

March 26

- 18:00 UTC at 9.1°N 135.5°E – After briefly weakening, Jelawat re-deepens to a central pressure of 1,000 hPa (1,000 mbar; 29.53 inHg) per the JTWC as the system is about to enter the PAR.

March 27

- 00:00 UTC (08:00 PHT) at 9.5°N 135.0°E – Tropical Storm Jelawat enters the PAR, prompting the PAGASA to assign it the local name Caloy.
- 18:00 UTC at 11.2°N 135.4°E – The JTWC upgrades Jelawat (Caloy) to a tropical storm as it moves northward.

March 28

- 00:00 UTC (08:00 PHT) at 12.5°N 135.0°E – Jelawat (Caloy) attains its within-PAR peak of 10-minute winds of 45 knots (83 km/h; 52 mph) and a minimum central pressure of 994 hPa (994.0 mbar; 29.35 inHg) as it turns to a north-northeastward heading.
- Around 01:00 UTC (09:00 PHT) – PAGASA reports Jelawat (Caloy) has exited the PAR.
- 06:00 UTC at 13.7°N 135.0°E – The JMA upgrades Jelawat to a severe tropical storm.

March 29

- 00:00 UTC at 15.3°N 135.3°E – The JMA further upgrades Jelawat to a typhoon as it slowly turns eastwards.
- 18:00 UTC at 15.3°N 136.9°E – The JTWC follows suit, upgrading Jelawat to a Category 1-equivalent typhoon on the Saffir–Simpson scale (SSHWS).

Morphed Microwave Imagery (MMI) of Jelawat rapidly intensifying on March 29–30.

March 30

- 00:00 UTC at 15.7°N 137.4°E – Jelawat continues intensifying, reaching Category 2-equivalent typhoon status as it moves east-northeast.
- 06:00 UTC at 16.2°N 138.1°E – The JMA estimates that Jelawat has peaked in intensity with 10-minute sustained winds of 105 knots (194 km/h; 121 mph) and a minimum central pressure of 915 hPa (915.0 mbar; 27.02 inHg); meanwhile, the JTWC further upgrades Jelawat to a Category 4-equivalent typhoon as it continues rapidly intensifying.
- 12:00 UTC at 16.8°N 139.1°E – The JTWC further upgrades Jelawat to a Category 4 super typhoon, peaking with maximum 1-minute winds of 130 knots (240 km/h; 150 mph) and a minimum central pressure of 926 hPa (926.0 mbar; 27.34 inHg) while moving northeastward.
- 18:00 UTC at 17.5°N 139.9°E – The JTWC downgrades Jelawat back to a Category 4 typhoon.

March 31

- 00:00 UTC at 18.1°N 140.7°E – The JTWC downgrades Jelawat to a Category 3-equivalent typhoon.
- 06:00 UTC at 18.3°N 141.6°E – Typhoon Jelawat further weakens to a Category 1 typhoon.
- 12:00 UTC at 18.4°N 142.5°E – Jelawat continues weakening with the JTWC downgrading it to a tropical storm.
- 18:00 UTC at 19.1°N 143.5°E – The JMA assesses Jelawat has rapidly weakened to a tropical storm.

=== April ===
April 1

- 00:00 UTC at 19.3°N 144.4°E – The JMA further downgrades Jelawat to a tropical depression as it approaches a stationary front.
- 06:00 UTC at 19.8°N 146.0°E – The JTWC re-classifies Jelawat as having transitioned to a subtropical storm.
- 12:00 UTC – Jelawat transitions to an extratropical low per the JMA as the system starts to develop frontal characteristics.

=== May ===
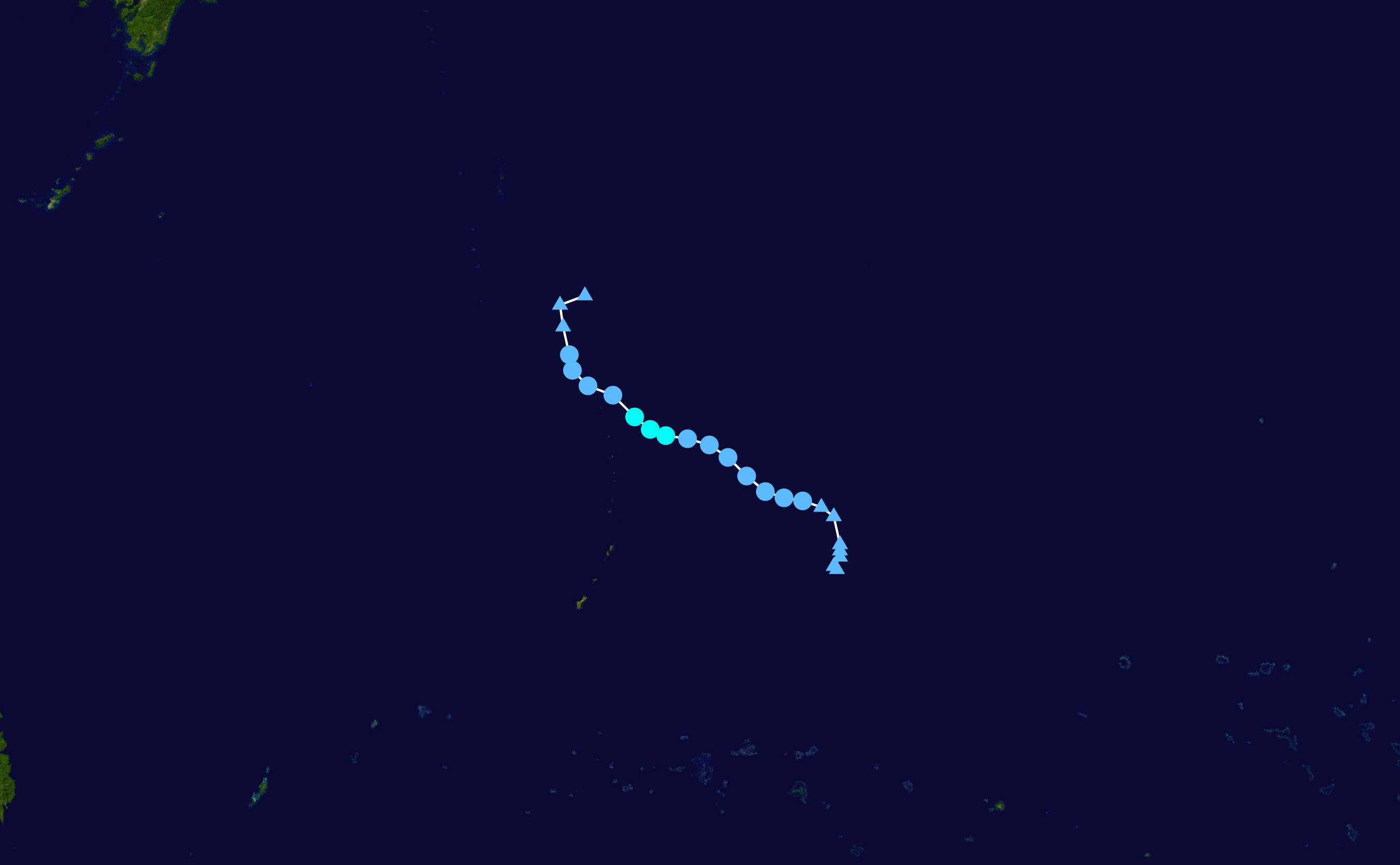
Track of 04W during early-mid May.

May 10

- 00:00 UTC at 15.3°N 153.1°E – The JMA begins tracking a tropical depression east-northeast of Guam.
- 06:00 UTC at 16.2°N 152.9°E – The JMA assesses the tropical depression east-northeast of Guam has attained a central pressure of 1,008 hPa (1,008 mbar; 29.77 inHg).
- 18:00 UTC at 16.7°N 151.9°E – The JTWC designates the tropical depression east-northeast of Guam as 04W as the system turned to the west-northwest.

May 11

- 18:00 UTC at 18.1°N 149.5°E – After a brief rise in pressure, 04W re-deepens to a central pressure of 1,008 hPa (1,008 mbar; 29.77 inHg)

May 12

- 12:00 UTC at 18.8°N 147.5°E – The JTWC upgrades 04W to a tropical storm, subsequently peaking with 1-minute sustained winds of 35 knots (65 km/h; 40 mph) and a minimum central pressure of 1,004 hPa (1,004 mbar; 29.65 inHg) as it approaches the Northern Mariana Islands.
- 18:00 UTC at 18.8°N 147.0°E – The JMA reports 04W has attained peak 10-minute winds of 30 knots (56 km/h; 35 mph).

May 13

- 06:00 UTC at 20.1°N 145.8°E – The JMA reports 04W has re-attained a central pressure of 1,008 hPa (1,008 mbar; 29.77 inHg) while the JTWC downgrades the system to a tropical depression as it continues to move west-northwest.
- 18:00 UTC at 20.6°N 144.4°E – The JMA assesses 04W's central pressure fluctuates to its lower limit of 1,008 hPa (1,008 mbar; 29.77 inHg)

May 14

- 06:00 UTC at 22.3°N 144.2°E – The JTWC further downgrades 04W to a tropical disturbance as the system moves northward.
- 18:00 UTC at 23°N 145°E – Ex-04W's central pressure fluctuates back to 1,008 hPa (1,008 mbar; 29.77 inHg).

May 15

- 00:00 UTC – The JMA last notes Ex-04W as it becomes absorbed by an extratropical low, with the system fully dissipating six hours later.

=== June ===
June 2

- 12:00 UTC at 12.6°N 111.4°E – The JTWC begins tracking a tropical depression, designating it 05W near Vietnam.
- 18:00 UTC at 14.2°N 112.0°E – The JMA begins tracking 05W as a tropical depression as it moves generally northward over the South China Sea.

June 3

- 06:00 UTC at 14.8°N 110.5°E – The JTWC assesses 05W has deepened to 1,003 hPa (1,003 mbar; 29.62 inHg) before briefly rising again as it slowly moves along the coast of Vietnam.
- 18:00 UTC at 9.7°N 131.8°E – The JMA begins tracking a tropical depression in the southern Philippine Sea with a central pressure of 1,004 hPa (1,004 mbar; 29.65 inHg).

June 4

- 00:00 UTC at 11.9°N 140.9°E – The JMA begins tracking a tropical depression northeast of Yap with a central pressure of 1,006 hPa (1,006 mbar; 29.71 inHg).

June 5

- 00:00 UTC
  - At 17.5°N 111.4°E – The JMA upgrades 05W to a tropical storm, assigning it the name Ewiniar as it moves around Hainan.
  - (08:00 PHT) at 10.2°N 131.9°E – The PAGASA assigns the local name Domeng to the tropical depression in the southern Philippine Sea.
- 06:00 UTC at 14.2°N 133.6°E – The JMA last notes the tropical depression formerly northeast of Yap as it gets absorbed by Tropical Depression Domeng; the system was unmarked six hours later.
- 18:00 UTC
  - At 12.1°N 131.7°E – The JMA assesses that Tropical Depression Domeng has deepened with a pressure of 1,002 hPa (1,002 mbar; 29.59 inHg) as it gradually moves northward.
  - At 20.4°N 110.9°E – The JTWC also upgrades Ewiniar to a tropical storm, with 1-minute sustained winds of 35 knots (65 km/h; 40 mph) as it nears the Leizhou Peninsula.
  - (02:00 PHT, June 6) at 12.1°N 131.9°E – The PAGASA assesses that Domeng has slightly deepened to a pressure of 1,002 hPa (1,002 mbar; 29.59 inHg).
- 22:25 UTC (06:25 CST, June 6) at 20.3°N 110.2°E – Tropical Storm Ewiniar makes its first landfall on Xuwen County, Guangdong after the system turns westward.

June 6

- 06:00 UTC
  - At 20.1°N 110.4°E – The JMA reports Ewiniar has attained its lowest pressure of 998 hPa (998.0 mbar; 29.47 inHg) as the system crosses the Qiongzhou Strait towards Hainan.
  - At 13.8°N 130.7°E – Tropical Depression Domeng has re-deepened to a pressure of 1,002 hPa (1,002 mbar; 29.59 inHg) as it moves northwestward east of Bicol Region per the JMA.
  - (14:00 PHT) at 13.9°N 130.7°E – The PAGASA reports Domeng re-attained a low pressure of 1,002 hPa (1,002 mbar; 29.59 inHg) as it gains speed.
- 06:50 UTC (14:50 CST) at 20.0°N 110.3°E – Tropical Storm Ewiniar makes its second landfall on Haikou City, Hainan.
- 12:00 UTC at 20.3°N 110.6°E – The JTWC downgrades Ewiniar to a tropical depression as the system is about to emerge over the South China Sea, moving northeastward.

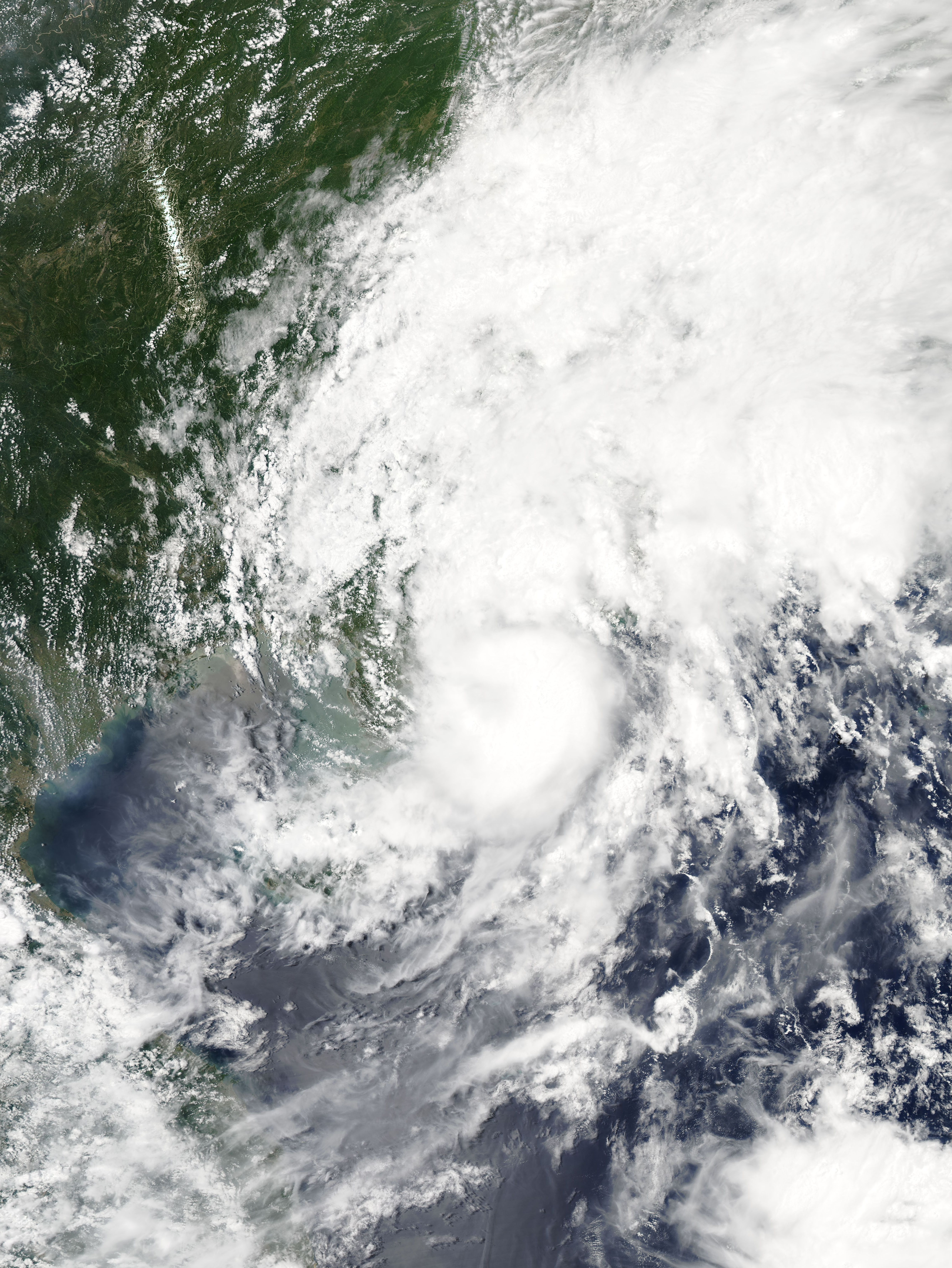
Ewiniar at its peak intensity on June 7.

June 7

- 00:00 UTC at 20.6°N 111.1°E – The JTWC re-upgrades Ewiniar to a tropical storm, having attained its lowest central pressure of 996 hPa (996.0 mbar; 29.41 inHg), after completing a counter-clockwise loop track and heads to Southern China.
- 06:00 UTC
  - At 21.0°N 111.4°E – The JMA estimates that Ewiniar has peaked in 10-minute winds of 40 knots (74 km/h; 46 mph) as it moves north-northeastward.
  - At 21.0°N 111.6°E – The JTWC assesses Ewiniar has also attained its peak 1-minute winds of 40 knots (74 km/h; 46 mph) as it nears the southern coast of China.
- 12:00 UTC at 15.8°N 126.4°E – The JTWC begins tracking Domeng, designating it 06W east of Central Luzon.
- 12:30 UTC (20:30 CST) at 21.9°N 112.0°E – Tropical Storm Ewiniar makes its third and final landfall on Yangjiang, Guangdong.
- 18:00 UTC
  - At 17.3°N 127.9°E – The JMA upgrades 06W (Domeng) to a tropical storm, assigning it the name Maliksi.
  - At 16.5°N 126.7°E – The JTWC also upgrades Maliksi (Domeng) to a tropical storm as it steadily moves northward.
  - (02:00 PHT, June 8) at 17.3°N 127.8°E – The PAGASA follows suit, upgrading Maliksi (Domeng) to a tropical storm.

June 8

- 00:00 UTC at 22.7°N 112.3°E – The JTWC downgrades Ewiniar to a tropical depression as it moves further inland.
- 12:00 UTC at 23.3°N 112.5°E – The JTWC last notes Ewiniar as it further decays to a tropical disturbance.
- 18:00 UTC at 23.1°N 113.3°E – The JMA downgrades Ewiniar to a tropical depression as it turns eastward.

June 9

- 06:00 UTC (14:00 PHT) at 22.3°N 127.5°E – The JMA and PAGASA both upgrade Maliksi (Domeng) to a severe tropical storm south of Okinawa while the system turns to the northeast.

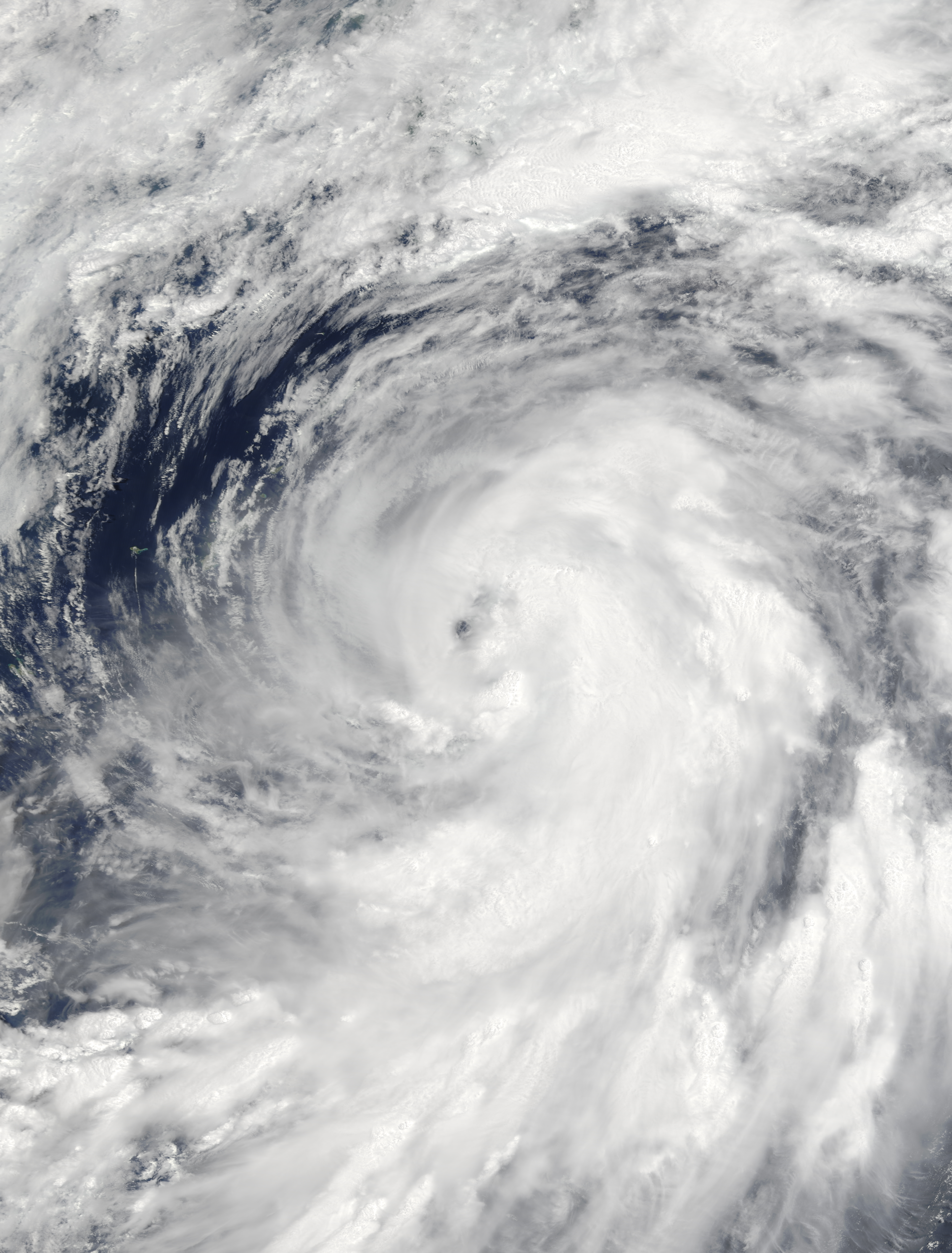
Maliksi at its peak intensity on June 10.

June 10

- 00:00 UTC
  - (08:00 PHT) at 25.0°N 130.7°E – Both the JMA and PAGASA estimate Maliksi (Domeng) has peaked in intensity with 10-minute winds of 60 knots (110 km/h; 69 mph) and a central pressure of 970 hPa (970.0 mbar; 28.64 inHg) while gradually accelerating to the northeast.
  - At 25.3°N 130.7°E – The JTWC also reports Maliksi (Domeng) has peaked in intensity with 1-minute winds of 60 knots (110 km/h; 69 mph) and a central pressure of 974 hPa (974.0 mbar; 28.76 inHg) southeast of Okinawa.
- 01:00 UTC (09:00 PHT) – PAGASA reports Maliksi (Domeng) has left the PAR.
- 06:00 UTC at 23.1°N 118.6°E – The JMA reports Tropical Depression Ewiniar has re-attained its lowest pressure of 998 hPa (998.0 mbar; 29.47 inHg) as the system emerges over the Taiwan Strait.
- Between 06:00 - 12:00 UTC (14:00 - 20:00 TST) – Tropical Depression Ewiniar rapidly crosses Taiwan from west to east.
- 18:00 UTC at 23.9°N 122.8°E – Ewiniar deepens again to its lowest pressure of 998 hPa (998.0 mbar; 29.47 inHg) as the system moves east-northeast near the Ryukyu Islands.

June 11

- 00:00 UTC at 30.9°N 138.5°E – The JTWC assesses Maliksi has slightly deepened to a pressure of 978 hPa (978.0 mbar; 28.88 inHg) as it passes to the southeast of Japan.
- 06:00 UTC at 24.9°N 125.3°E – The JMA last notes Ewiniar as it becomes part of the frontal characteristics from transitioning Maliksi, with the system fully dissipating six hours later near Miyako-jima.
- 12:00 UTC at 34.9°N 144.5°E – The JTWC reports Maliksi has transitioned into an extratropical cyclone.
- 18:00 UTC at 36.5°N 148.0°E – The JMA declares Maliksi had turned extratropical east of Japan.

June 12

- 18:00 UTC at 38.8°N 157.7°E – The JMA last notes the extratropical remnants of Maliksi as it dissipates well east of Japan; the system fully dissipates six hours later.

June 13

- 00:00 UTC at 20.9°N 120.3°E – The JTWC marks a subtropical depression over the Luzon Strait along the meiyu front, designating it 07W. (Note: Operationally, the JTWC marked the system as a tropical cyclone, but post-analysis reconsiders 07W as a subtropical cyclone.)
- 12:00 UTC at 21.6°N 117.1°E – A tropical depression develops west-southwest of Taiwan within the same meiyu front.

June 14

- 00:00 UTC at 25.3°N 124.5°E – The JTWC reports 07W has intensified to a subtropical storm with 1-minute winds of 35 knots (65 km/h; 40 mph) and a central pressure of 993 hPa (993.0 mbar; 29.32 inHg) as it starts its extratropical transition.
- 06:00 UTC at 26.8°N 126.4°E – The JTWC assesses that 07W has transitioned into an extratropical cyclone west of Okinawa.
- 06:00 UTC at 21.7°N 119.0°E – The JTWC begins tracking the tropical depression west-southwest of Taiwan, designating it 08W as it moves closer to the said country.
- Around 16:00 UTC (00:00 PHT, June 15) – 08W enters the PAR, prompting the PAGASA to assign it the name Ester.
- 18:00 UTC at 22.7°N 120.2°E – The JTWC upgrades 08W (Ester) to a tropical storm with an initial peak of 1-minute winds of 35 knots (65 km/h; 40 mph) and a central pressure of 993 hPa (993.0 mbar; 29.32 inHg) as it is about to strike Taiwan.

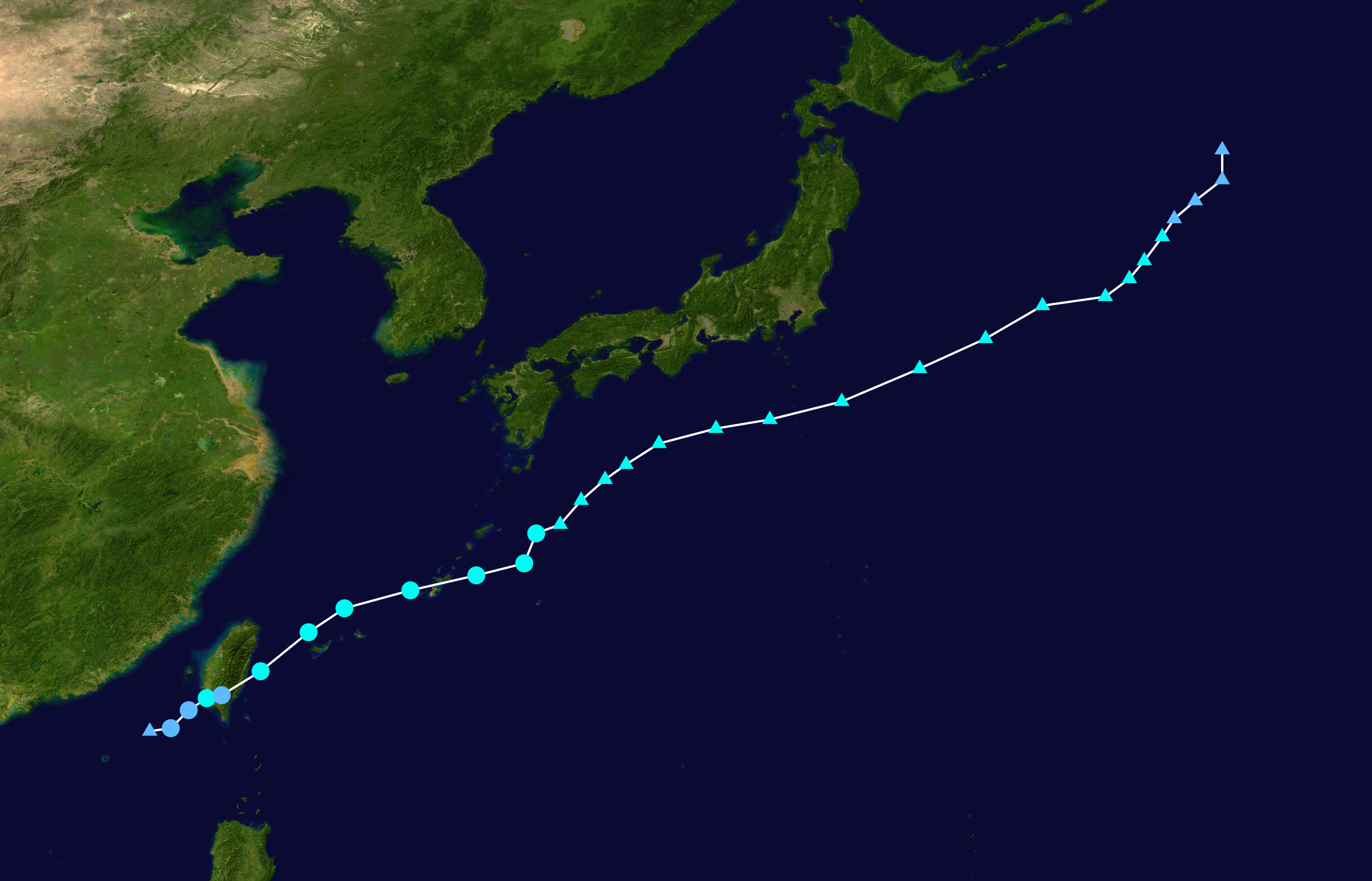
Track of Gaemi at mid-June.

June 15

- 00:00 UTC
  - At 22.7°N 120.2°E – The JMA upgrades 08W (Ester) to a tropical storm, assigning it the name Gaemi and subsequently makes landfall on Kaohsiung City.
  - At 22.8°N 120.7°E – The JTWC downgrades Gaemi (Ester) to a tropical depression as it crosses Taiwan.
- 06:00 UTC at 23.6°N 122.0°E – The JTWC re-upgrades Gaemi (Ester)to a tropical storm with a secondary peak of 1-minute winds of 35 knots (65 km/h; 40 mph) and a higher central pressure of 995 hPa (995.0 mbar; 29.38 inHg) as it emerges over the northern Philippine Sea.
- 12:00 UTC (20:00 PHT) – Tropical Storm Gaemi (Ester) reaches its within-PAR peak of 10-minute winds of 35 knots (65 km/h; 40 mph) and a central pressure of 992 hPa (992.0 mbar; 29.29 inHg) as it accelerates northeastward.
- Around 15:00 UTC (23:00 PHT) – Tropical Storm Gaemi (Ester) exits the PAR while paralleling the Ryukyu Islands.
- 18:00 UTC at 25.7°N 124.8°E – The JTWC analyzes Gaemi has turned to a subtropical storm as it continues moving northeastward.

June 16

- Between 00:00 - 06:00 UTC (09:00 - 15:00 JST) – Tropical Storm Gaemi crosses Okinawa.
- 06:00 UTC at 26.8°N 128.9°E – The JMA estimates that Gaemi has peaked in intensity with 10-minute winds of 45 knots (83 km/h; 52 mph) and a central pressure of 990 hPa (990.0 mbar; 29.23 inHg) as it continues to move east-northeastward.

June 17

- 00:00 UTC
  - At 28.5°N 132.1°E – The JMA assesses that Gaemi has transitioned into an extratropical cyclone.
  - At 19.3°N 114.2°E – Another tropical depression forms in the northern South China Sea.
- 12:00 UTC at 21.7°N 116.0°E – The tropical depression in the South China Sea attains its peak intensity of 10-minute winds of 30 knots (56 km/h; 35 mph) and a lowest central pressure of 998 hPa (998.0 mbar; 29.47 inHg) as it approaches the southern coast of China.

June 18

- 00:00 UTC at 22.8°N 116.3°E – The JMA last notes the tropical depression near the southern coast of China, with the system dissipating six hours later.

June 21

- 12:00 UTC at 41.0°N 154.1°E – The JMA last notes the extratropical remains of Gaemi; the system dissipates six hours later well east of Japan.

June 28

- 00:00 UTC
  - At 19.8°N 132.8°E – The JMA begins tracking a tropical depression over the Philippine Sea.
- (08:00 PHT) at 19.8°N 133.0°E – PAGASA designates the tropical depression over the Philippine Sea as Florita.
- 12:00 UTC at 20.1°N 131.6°E – The JTWC follows suit, designating Florita as 09W.

June 29

- 00:00 UTC
  - (08:00 PHT) at 19.8°N 130.3°E – Both JMA and PAGASA upgrade 09W (Florita) to a tropical storm, with the former assigning it the name Prapiroon.
  - At 19.4°N 130.5°E – The JTWC also upgrades Prapiroon (Florita) to a tropical storm.
- 18:00 UTC at 20.3°N 129.7°E – The JTWC assesses Prapiroon (Florita) has reached an initial peak of 1-minute winds of 50 knots (93 km/h; 58 mph) and a central pressure of 990 hPa (990.0 mbar; 29.23 inHg) as it slowly turns northwestward.

=== July ===
July 1

- 00:00 UTC
  - At 23.6°N 127.7°E – The JMA reports Prapiroon (Florita) has further intensified to a severe tropical storm.
  - (08:00 PHT) at 23.6°N 127.6°E – PAGASA follows suit, upgrading Prapiroon (Florita) to a severe tropical storm.
- 06:00 UTC (14:00 PHT) at 24.4°N 127.2°E – Prapiroon (Florita) reaches its within-PAR peak, as assessed by PAGASA, with 10-minute winds of 55 knots (102 km/h; 63 mph) and a central pressure of 980 hPa (980.0 mbar; 28.94 inHg).
- 11:00 UTC (19:00 PHT) – PAGASA reports Prapiroon (Florita) has left the PAR as it enters the East China Sea.
- 18:00 UTC at 26.2°N 126.8°E – The JTWC upgrades Prapiroon to a Category 1 typhoon as it starts to turn north-northeastward.
- Between 18:00 - 21:00 UTC (03:00 - 06:00 JST, July 2) – Prapiroon crosses Kume Island, Okinawa.

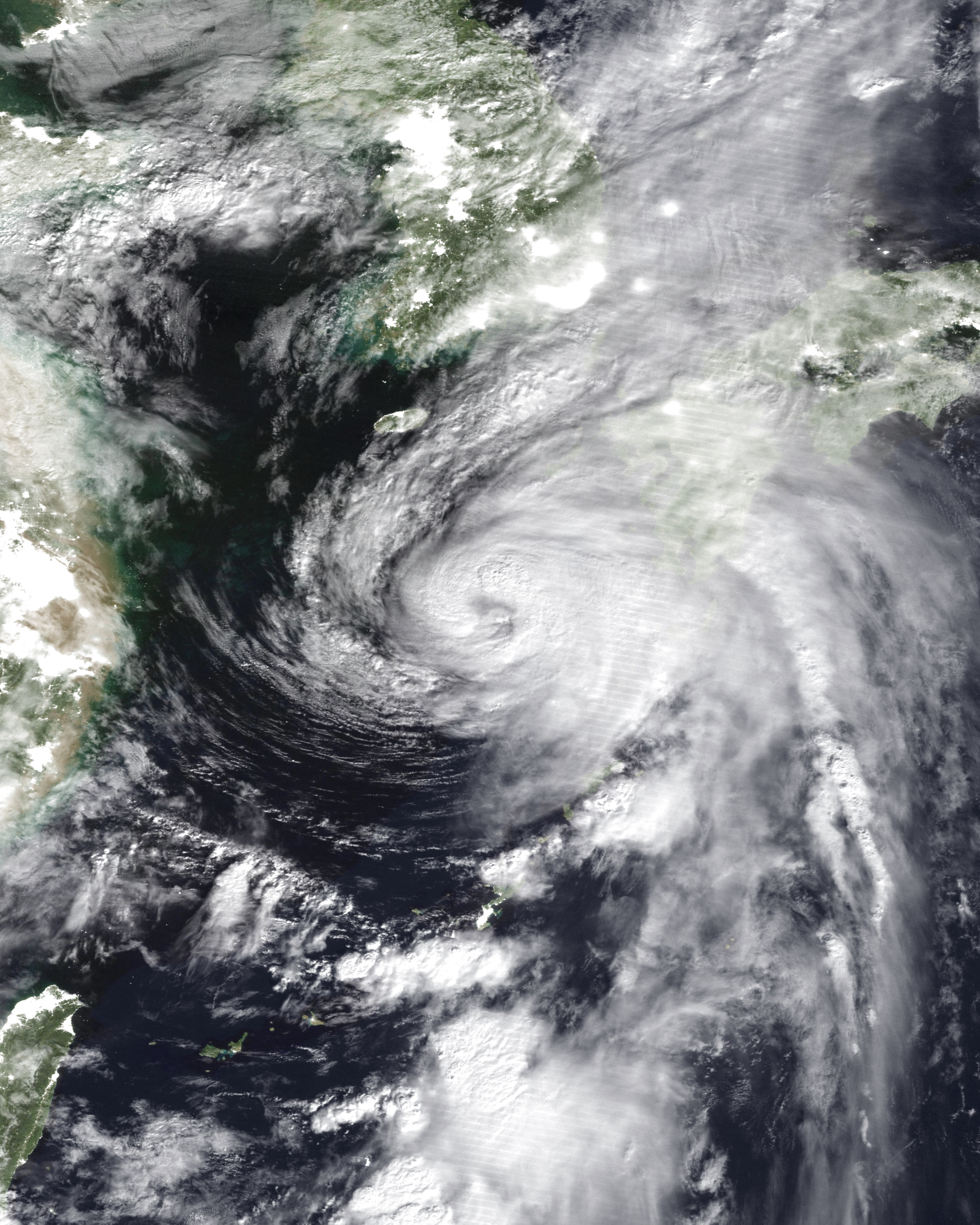
Prapiroon near Japan at peak intensity on July 2.

July 2

- 00:00 UTC at 27.2°N 127.0°E – The JMA upgrades Prapiroon to a typhoon, subsequently peaking in 10-minute winds of 65 knots (120 km/h; 75 mph) as it passes west of Okinawa.
- 06:00 UTC at 28.2°N 127.2°E – The JTWC estimates that Prapiroon has reached its maximum 1-minute sustained winds of 80 knots (150 km/h; 92 mph).
- 18:00 UTC
  - At 30.7°N 127.8°E – The JMA estimates that Prapiroon has reached its lowest central pressure at 960 hPa (960.0 mbar; 28.35 inHg) west of Kyushu.
  - At 30.7°N 127.9°E – The JTWC also reports that Prapiroon has reached its lowest central pressure at 960 hPa (960.0 mbar; 28.35 inHg) as it continues to move north-northeastward.

July 3

- 00:00 UTC
  - At 32.0°N 128.2°E – The JMA downgrades Prapiroon to a severe tropical storm as it starts to bypass the Korea Strait.
  - At 10.1°N 147.8°E – The JMA begins tracking a tropical depression southeast of Guam.
- 12:00 UTC
  - At 34.4°N 129.8°E – The JTWC also downgrades Prapiroon to a tropical storm while passing east of Tsushima Island.
  - At 11.1°N 146.7°E – The JTWC designates the tropical depression southeast of Guam as 10W.

July 4

- 00:00 UTC
  - At 37.3°N 132.5°E – The JMA further downgrades Prapiroon to a tropical storm while accelerating northeastwards over the Sea of Japan.
  - At 11.7°N 146.3°E – The JTWC upgrades 10W to a tropical storm as it moves closer to Guam.
- 06:00 UTC
  - At 39.6°N 134.8°E – The JMA assesses that Prapiroon has transitioned into an extratropical cyclone.
  - At 39.2°N 134.7°E – The JTWC also assesses that Prapiroon has transitioned into an extratropical cyclone.
- 12:00 UTC at 12.6°N 145.6°E – The JMA upgrades 10W to a tropical storm, assigning it the name Maria.
- Around 18:00 UTC (04:00 ChST, July 5) at 13.5°N 144.9°E – Maria hits the northern portion of Guam.

Maria rapidly intensifying late on July 5.

July 5

- 00:00 UTC at 14.1°N 144.1°E – The JMA further upgrades Maria to a severe tropical storm as it now moves away from Guam.
- 06:00 UTC
  - At 41.7°N 140.2°E – The JMA last notes the extratropical remnants of Prapiroon as it dissipates near northern Japan, with the system being unrecognizable six hours later.
  - At 14.5°N 143.3°E – The JTWC upgrades Maria to a Category 1 typhoon.
- 12:00 UTC at 14.8°N 142.7°E – The JMA reports Maria has strengthened to a typhoon while the JTWC assesses Maria has reached Category 2 typhoon status.
- 18:00 UTC at 15.4°N 142.4°E – The JTWC reports Maria has rapidly intensified to a Category 4-equivalent typhoon on the SSHWS.

July 6

- 00:00 UTC at 15.9°N 142.0°E – The JTWC assesses Maria has reached super typhoon status, subsequently peaking initially with 1-minute sustained winds of 135 knots (250 km/h; 155 mph) and a minimum central pressure at 924 hPa (924.0 mbar; 27.29 inHg).
- 12:00 UTC at 16.7°N 141.3°E – The JMA estimates that Maria has reached an initial peak intensity with 10-minute winds of 100 knots (190 km/h; 120 mph) and a minimum central pressure at 925 hPa (925.0 mbar; 27.32 inHg). The JTWC assesses Maria's central pressure slightly dropping to 925 hPa (925.0 mbar; 27.32 inHg) after a brief rise earlier.
- 18:00 UTC at 16.9°N 140.9°E – Typhoon Maria falls below super typhoon status while slowly moving northwest, but remains a Category 4 typhoon per the JTWC.

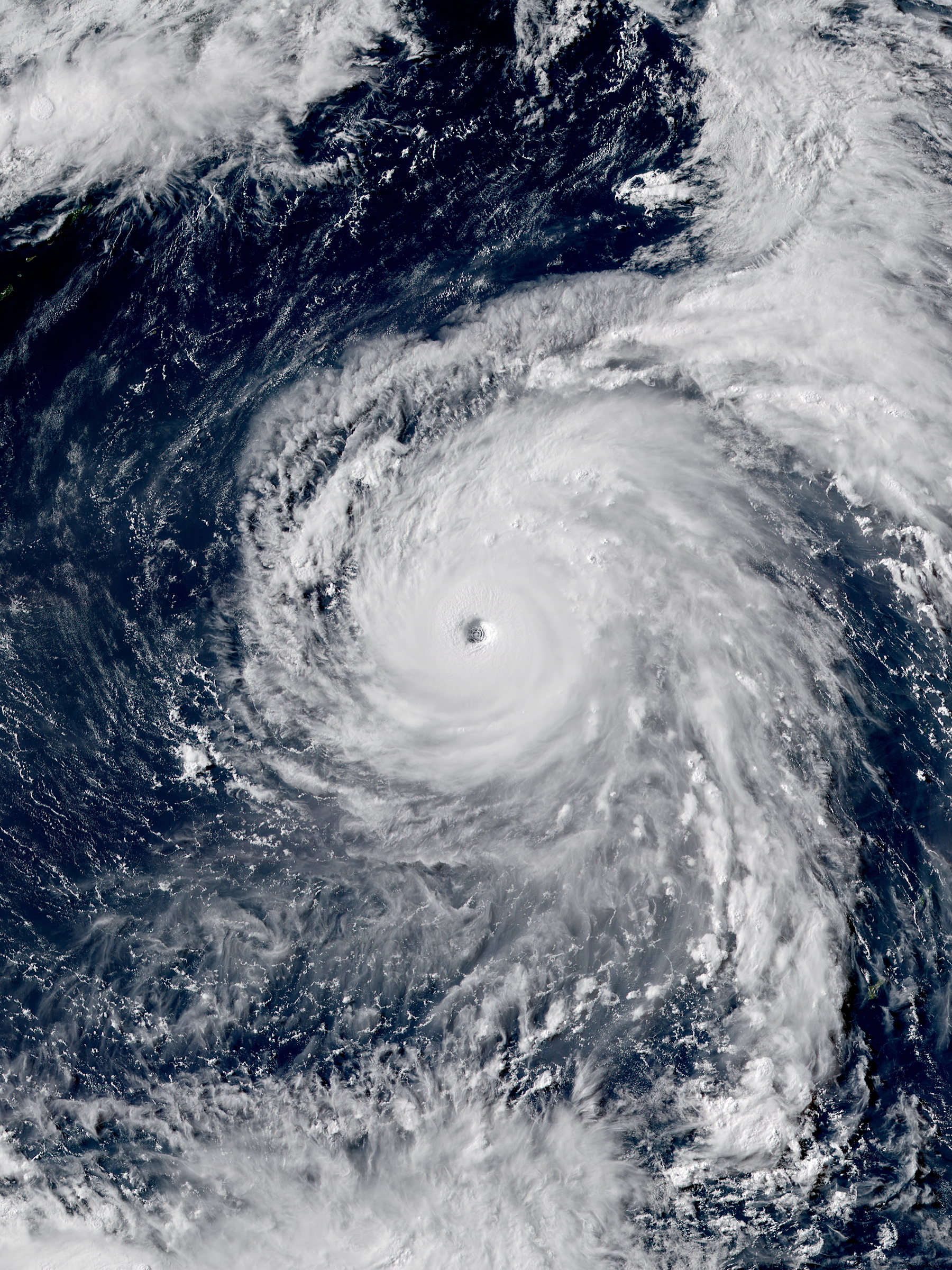
Maria near its peak intensity on July 8.

July 8

- 00:00 UTC at 19.1°N 138.8°E – Typhoon Maria re-strengthens to a Category 4 super typhoon.
- 06:00 UTC at 19.8°N 137.8°E – The JTWC further upgrades Maria to a Category 5-equivalent super typhoon on the SSHWS.
- 12:00 UTC at 20.5°N 136.5°E – The JTWC assesses Super Typhoon Maria has peaked in intensity with higher 1-minute sustained winds of 145 knots (269 km/h; 167 mph) and a lower central pressure at 910 hPa (910.0 mbar; 26.87 inHg).
- Around 19:00 UTC (03:00 PHT, July 9) – Maria enters the PAR, with PAGASA assigning it the local name Gardo. The agency assesses the system of having 10-minute winds of 105 knots (194 km/h; 121 mph) and a minimum central pressure of 915 hPa (915.0 mbar; 27.02 inHg), making it a super typhoon. (Note: Since March 23, 2022, PAGASA has defined a super-typhoon as a tropical cyclone with maximum 10-minute sustained winds of ≥185 kilometres per hour (100 kn; 51 m/s; 115 mph).)

July 9

- 00:00 UTC at 21.8°N 133.5°E – The JMA estimates that Maria (Gardo) has peaked in intensity with 10-minute winds of 105 knots (194 km/h; 121 mph) and a minimum central pressure of 915 hPa (915.0 mbar; 27.02 inHg).
- 06:00 UTC at 22.4°N 131.9°E – The JTWC reports Maria (Gardo) has weakened to a Category 4-equivalent super typhoon while moving west-northwestwards over the Philippine Sea .
- 12:00 UTC
  - At 22.9°N 130.3°E – Maria (Gardo) further weakens to a Category 4 typhoon per the JTWC.
  - (20:00 PHT) at 23.0°N 130.3°E – PAGASA also reports Maria (Gardo) has weakened below super typhoon status.

July 10

- 00:00 UTC at 24.0°N 127.2°E – The JTWC further downgrades Maria (Gardo) to a Category 3-equivalent typhoon as it nears the Ryukyu Islands.
- Between 06:00 - 09:00 UTC (15:00 - 18:00 JST) – Typhoon Maria (Gardo) hits Miyako and Irabu Islands.
- Around 11:00 UTC (19:00 PHT) – PAGASA reports Maria (Gardo) has exited the PAR while passing northeast of Taiwan.
- 12:00 UTC at 25.3°N 124.0°E – The JTWC further downgrades Maria to a Category 2 typhoon while moving northwestwards.

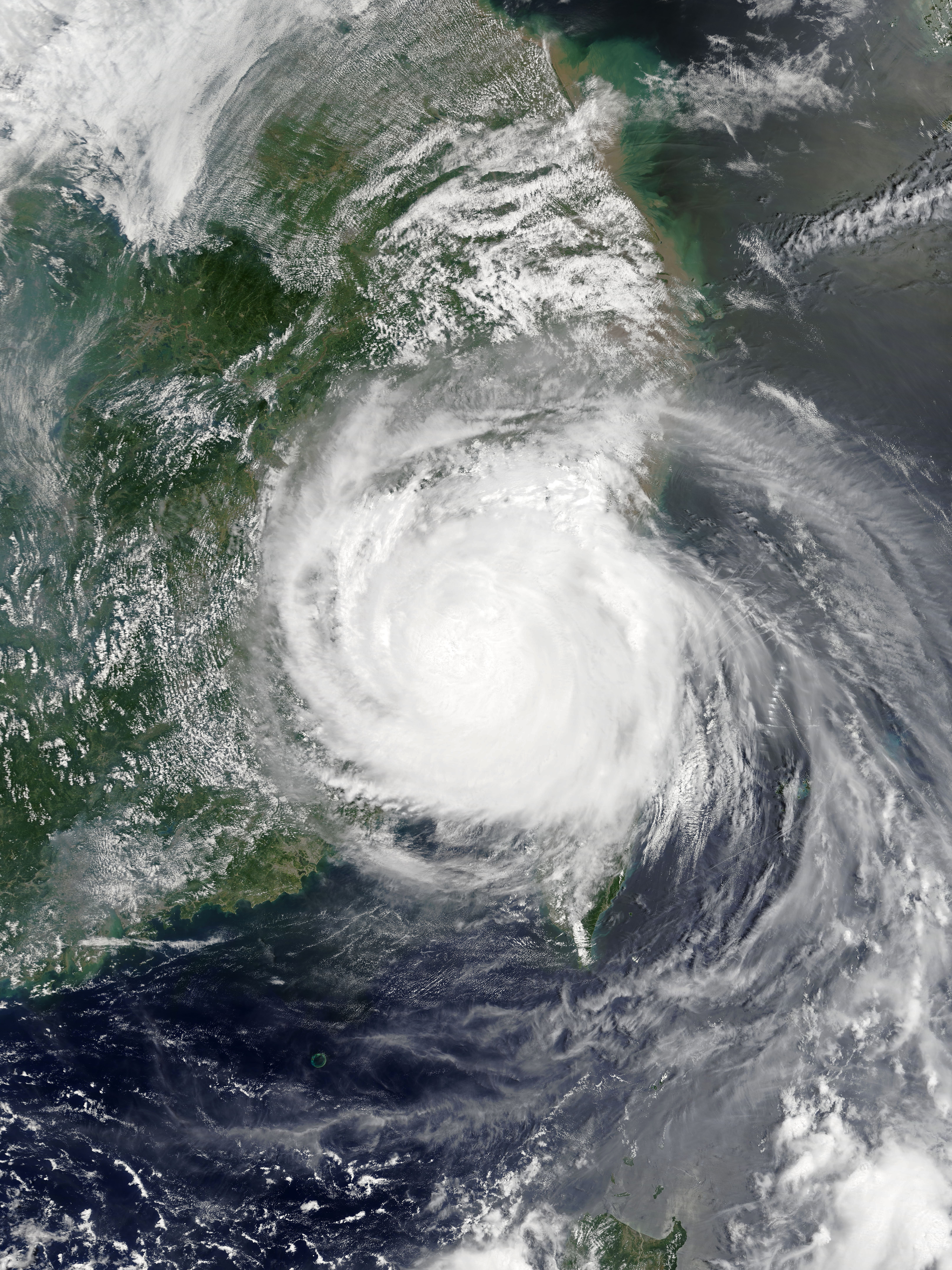
Maria shortly after hitting China on July 11.

July 11

- 00:00 UTC at 26.4°N 120.0°E – The JTWC reports Maria's pressure slightly dropped to 951 hPa (951.0 mbar; 28.08 inHg) as it is about to hit China.
- 01:10 UTC (09:10 CST) at 26.3°N 119.9°E – Typhoon Maria makes landfall on Huangqi Peninsula, Lianjiang County, Fuzhou, Fujian.
- 06:00 UTC at 26.5°N 118.5°E – The JTWC further downgrades Maria to a Category 1 typhoon as it moves further inland.
- 12:00 UTC
  - At 26.7°N 116.7°E – The JMA reports Maria has rapidly weakened to a tropical storm.
  - At 26.7°N 116.4°E – The JTWC follows suit, downgrading Maria to a tropical storm.
- 18:00 UTC
  - At 27.9°N 115.6°E – The JMA further downgrades Maria to a tropical depression as it turns northwestward.
  - At 27.5°N 115.3°E – The JTWC last notes Maria as it weakens to a tropical depression.

July 12

- 18:00 UTC at 30.6°N 111.8°E – The JMA last notes Tropical Depression Maria as it further weakens inland; the system fully dissipates six hours later.

July 14

- 00:00 UTC at 19.8°N 136.0°E – The JTWC upgrades a tropical disturbance to a tropical depression over the Philippine Sea, designating it 11W.

July 15

- 12:00 UTC (20:00 PHT) at 19.1°N 128.2°E – The PAGASA assigns the local name Henry to 11W.
- 18:00 UTC at 19.2°N 126.9°E – The JTWC reports 11W (Henry) has deepened to a central pressure of 1,000 hPa (1,000 mbar; 29.53 inHg).

July 16

- 00:00 UTC
  - At 18.4°N 125.3°E – The JMA begins tracking 11W (Henry), estimating that it has developed into a tropical depression while moving westwards.
  - At 18.6°N 107.3°E – The JMA begins tracking a tropical depression in the Gulf of Tonkin with a central pressure of 998 hPa (998.0 mbar; 29.47 inHg).
- 06:00 UTC (14:00 PHT) at 18.8°N 123.8°E – The PAGASA assesses 11W (Henry) has attained 10-minute winds of 30 knots (56 km/h; 35 mph) which would be its peak winds within the PAR.
- 12:00 UTC
  - At 18.6°N 122.7°E – The JTWC upgrades 11W to a tropical storm as it approaches Babuyan Islands.
  - (20:00 PHT) at 18.8°N 122.2°E – The PAGASA assesses 11W (Henry) has attained a central pressure of 994 hPa (994.0 mbar; 29.35 inHg) which would be its lowest pressure within the PAR, as it traverses the Babuyan Channel.
- Between 13:00 - 17:00 UTC (21:00 - 01:00 PHT, July 17) – Tropical Depression 11W (Henry) crossed or grazed the islands of Camiguin, Pamuktan, Fuga, Irao, and Dalupiri.

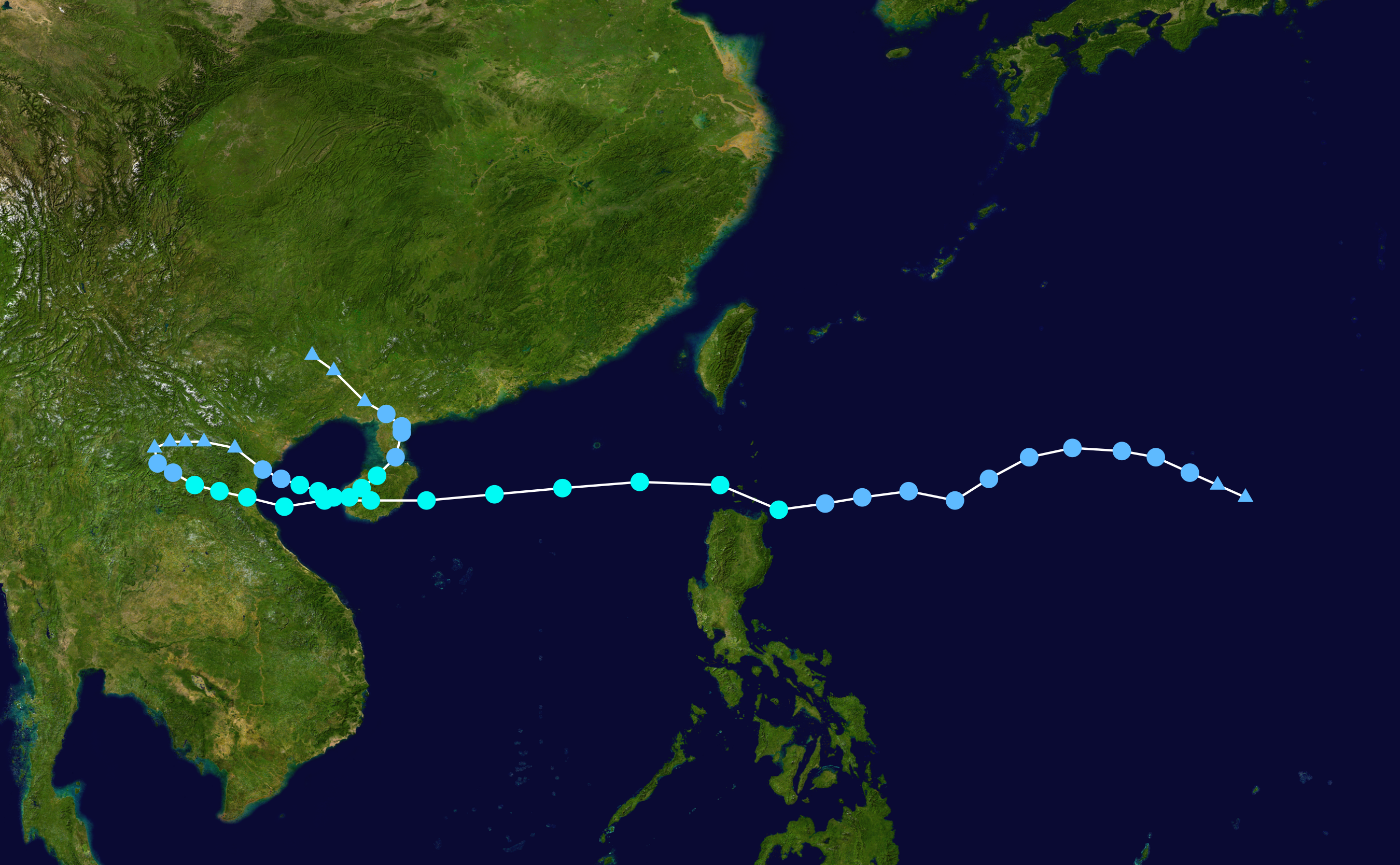
Track of Son-Tinh during mid-late July.

July 17

- 00:00 UTC
  - At 19.4°N 118.5°E – The JMA upgrades 11W (Henry) to a tropical storm, assigning it the name Son-Tinh as it now traverses the South China Sea.
  - At 19.3°N 118.4°E – The PAGASA reports Son-Tinh (Henry) has exited the PAR, as it intensifies to a tropical storm.
- 06:00 UTC (14:00 ICT) at 18.1°N 106.3°E – The tropical depression over the Gulf of Tonkin moves inland on Vietnam.
- 12:00 UTC
  - At 19.0°N 113.6°E – The JMA estimates that Son-Tinh has peaked with 10-minute winds of 40 knots (74 km/h; 46 mph) and a central pressure of 994 hPa (994.0 mbar; 29.35 inHg).
  - (20:00 PHT) at 18.4°N 127.9°E – The JMA and PAGASA begin tracking a tropical depression in the Philippine Sea, with the latter naming it Inday.
  - At 17.6°N 104.5°E – The JMA last notes the tropical depression formerly over Vietnam as it further moves inland into Indochina; the system fully dissipates six hours later over Laos.
  - At 19.1°N 113.5°E – The JTWC assesses Son-Tinh has deepened to a central pressure of 993 hPa (993.0 mbar; 29.32 inHg).
- 20:50 UTC (04:50 CST, July 18) at 19.1°N 113.5°E – Tropical Storm Son-Tinh makes landfall on Wanning, Hainan.

July 18

- 06:00 UTC at 18.8°N 107.9°E – The JMA reports that Son-Tinh has re-attained its peak intensity, after slightly weakening from landfall as it emerges over the Gulf of Tonkin.
- 12:00 UTC
  - At 19.7°N 130.0°E – The JMA upgrades Inday to a tropical storm, assigning it the name Ampil.
  - At 18.7°N 106.7°E – The JTWC estimates that Son-Tinh has peaked in intensity with maximum 1-minute sustained winds of 50 knots (93 km/h; 58 mph) and a central pressure of 989 hPa (989.0 mbar; 29.21 inHg) as it is about to make landfall in Vietnam.
  - (20:00 PHT) at 19.6°N 129.9°E – The PAGASA also upgrades Ampil (Inday) to a tropical storm as it moves to the northeast.
- 16:30 UTC (23:30 ICT) at 19.3°N 104.8°E – Tropical Storm Son-Tinh hits Nghệ An Province.

July 19

- 00:00 UTC at 19.1°N 104.4°E – The JMA downgrades Son-Tinh to a tropical depression as it moves further inland.
- 06:00 UTC at 20.6°N 131.5°E – The JTWC starts to classify Ampil (Inday) as a tropical storm after transitioning from a monsoon depression.
- 12:00 UTC at 19.8°N 103.1°E – The JTWC also downgrades Son-Tinh to a tropical depression as it turns northward over Laos.
- 18:00 UTC at 22.3°N 131.2°E – The JMA upgrades Ampil (Inday) to a severe tropical storm, assessing it has peaked in intensity with 10-minute winds of 50 knots (93 km/h; 58 mph) and a central pressure of 985 hPa (985.0 mbar; 29.09 inHg) after turning to the northwest.

July 20

- 00:00 UTC
  - At 20.6°N 102.5°E – The JTWC further downgrades Son-Tinh to a tropical disturbance as it starts to turn eastward.
  - (08:00 PHT) at 22.5°N 130.8°E – The PAGASA also upgrades Ampil (Inday) to a severe tropical storm attaining its peak intensity of 10-minute winds of 50 knots (93 km/h; 58 mph) and a central pressure of 985 hPa (985.0 mbar; 29.09 inHg).
- 12:00 UTC
  - At 18°N 117°E – The JMA begins tracking a tropical depression in the South China Sea.
  - At 18.0°N 116.4°E – The JTWC designates the tropical depression in the South China Sea as 13W.
- 16:00 UTC (00:00 PHT, July 21) – The PAGASA reports Ampil (Inday) has exited the PAR while moving towards the Ryukyu Islands.
- 18:00 UTC
  - At 25.4°N 128.9°E – The JTWC assesses Ampil has deepened to a central pressure of 985 hPa (985.0 mbar; 29.09 inHg) before slightly rising again, as it nears Okinawa.
  - (02:00 PHT, July 21) at 17.8°N 118.3°E – The PAGASA assigns the local name Josie to 13W as it enters the PAR while moving in an east-northeast direction.
- 23:00 UTC (08:00 JST) at 26.6°N 128.3°E – Ampil makes landfall on Okinawa.

July 21

- 00:00 UTC
  - At 18.2°N 118.8°E – The JMA assesses 13W (Josie) has attained its maximum 10-minute winds of 30 knots (56 km/h; 35 mph).
  - At 17.9°N 118.6°E – The JTWC upgrades 13W (Josie) to a tropical storm, subsequently attaining its peak 1-minute winds of 35 knots (65 km/h; 40 mph).
  - (08:00 PHT) at 17.9°N 118.1°E – The PAGASA also assesses 13W (Josie) has attained its maximum 10-minute winds of 30 knots (56 km/h; 35 mph).
- 06:00 UTC
  - At 18.5°N 119.5°E – The JMA estimates that 13W (Josie) has achieved its lowest central pressure of 996 hPa (996.0 mbar; 29.41 inHg).
  - At 27.7°N 126.8°E – The JTWC assesses Ampil has deepened to a lower central pressure of 983 hPa (983.0 mbar; 29.03 inHg) as it traverses the East China Sea.
  - At 19.9°N 106.0°E – The JTWC reports the remnants of Son-Tinh has reintensified to a tropical depression as it reemerges over the Gulf of Tonkin.
  - (14:00 PHT) at 18.4°N 119.8°E – The PAGASA assesses 13W (Josie) has attained its lowest central pressure at 994 hPa (994.0 mbar; 29.35 inHg) as it approaches northwestern Luzon.
- 12:00 UTC at 18.8°N 120.9°E – The JTWC estimates that 13W (Josie) has achieved its lowest central pressure at 995 hPa (995.0 mbar; 29.38 inHg) as it now approaches the Babuyan Islands.
- Between 12:00 - 18:00 UTC (20:00 - 02:00 PHT, July 22) – 13W (Josie) crosses the islands of Dalupiri and Calayan as it moves northeastward.
- 18:00 UTC
  - At 19.4°N 107.2°E – The JTWC re-upgrades Son-Tinh to a tropical storm while moving southeast, subsequently attaining a secondary peak winds of 35 knots (65 km/h; 40 mph).
  - At 19.7°N 121.9°E – The JTWC downgrades 13W (Josie) to a tropical depression as it crosses the Balintang Channel.

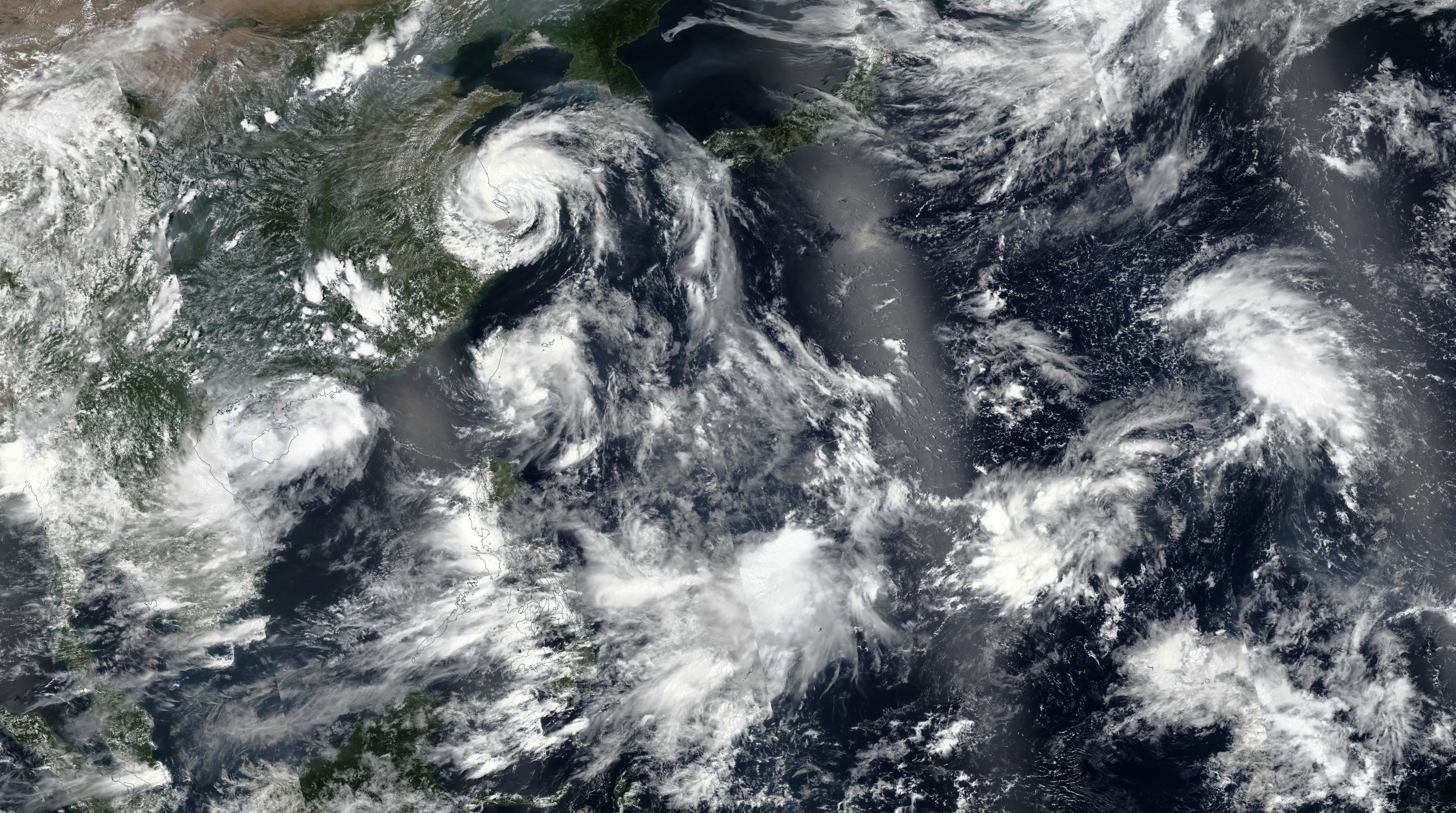
Five tropical systems active: Son-Tinh (left-most), Ampil (topmost-left), 13W/Josie (top-left), 14W/Pre-Wukong (top-right), and a low-pressure area east of the Philippines which would become Jongdari/15W (center).

July 22

- 00:00 UTC
  - At 30.7°N 123.2°E – Nearing China, the JMA downgrades Ampil to a tropical storm.
  - At 22.0°N 159.6°E – The JMA begins tracking a tropical depression well east-southeast of Minami-Tori-shima.
  - At 30.8°N 123.0°E – The JTWC estimates that Ampil has peaked with maximum 1-minute winds of 55 knots (102 km/h; 63 mph) and a central pressure of 982 hPa (982.0 mbar; 29.00 inHg).
  - At 20.5°N 123.3°E – The JTWC downgrades 13W (Josie) further to a low-pressure area.
  - At 22.1°N 159.2°E – The JTWC designates the tropical depression east-southeast of Minami-Tori-shima as 14W.
- 04:30 UTC (12:30 CST) at 31.7°N 121.5°E – Ampil makes landfall on Chongming, Shanghai.
- Between 09:00 - 12:00 UTC (17:00 - 20:00 CST) – Son-Tinh hits Hainan from the west.
- 06:00 UTC
  - At 22.4°N 122.6°E – The JMA assesses that Ex-13W (Josie) has deepened to a central pressure of 998 hPa (998.0 mbar; 29.47 inHg) as it turns northwards.
  - At 22.8°N 159.7°E – The JMA assesses that 14W has briefly deepened to a central pressure of 1,006 hPa (1,006 mbar; 29.71 inHg) before rising again as it moves northwards.
  - At 19.0°N 108.3°E – The JTWC reports Son-Tinh has deepened to a central pressure of 993 hPa (993.0 mbar; 29.32 inHg) as it is about to hit Hainan for the second time.
- 12:00 UTC at 19.1°N 109.0°E – The JMA assesses Tropical Depression Son-Tinh has deepened to a central pressure of 994 hPa (994.0 mbar; 29.35 inHg) as it turns to the northeast over Hainan.
- 18:00 UTC at 24.4°N 159.3°E – The JTWC reports 14W has intensified to a tropical storm.
- 20:00 UTC (04:00 PHT, July 23) – Tropical Depression Ex-13W (Josie) exits the PAR as the system enters the East China Sea.

July 23

- Between 03:00 - 06:00 UTC (11:00 - 14:00 CST) – Son-Tinh makes another landfall on the southern coastline of the Leizhou Peninsula.
- 06:00 UTC
  - At 20.4°N 110.4°E – The JMA assesses Tropical Depression Son-Tinh has re-attained a low central pressure of 994 hPa (994.0 mbar; 29.35 inHg).
  - At 20.3°N 110.3°E – The JTWC downgrades Son-Tinh again to a tropical depression.
  - At 35.4°N 118.4°E – The JTWC downgrades Ampil to a tropical depression, however, with a low central pressure of 989 hPa (989.0 mbar; 29.21 inHg).
- 12:00 UTC
  - At 21.1°N 110.5°E – The JTWC assesses Son-Tinh has deepened to a central pressure of 995 hPa (995.0 mbar; 29.38 inHg) as it emerges to the sea near the eastern coastline of the peninsula.
  - At 36.5°N 117.9°E – The JMA downgrades Ampil to a tropical depression as it moves further north over China .
  - At 27.3°N 159.4°E – The JMA upgrades 14W to a tropical storm, assigning it the name Wukong as it continues to move northwards.
- Between 15:00 - 18:00 UTC (23:00 - 02:00 CST, July 24) – Son-Tinh makes another landfall on the northeastern coastline of the Leizhou Peninsula after turning to the northwest.
- 18:00 UTC
  - At 31.3°N 122.4°E – The JMA last notes Ex-13W near the eastern coast of China, with the system dissipating six hours later.
  - At 17.4°N 137.0°E – Another tropical depression develops over the Philippine Sea.
  - At 17.2°N 136.5°E – The JTWC begins tracking the tropical depression in the Philippine Sea, designating it 15W.

July 24

- 00:00 UTC at 21.7°N 110.0°E – The JTWC assesses Son-Tinh has slightly deepened to a central pressure of 998 hPa (998.0 mbar; 29.47 inHg) despite moving further inland.
- 06:00 UTC
  - At 22.1°N 109.3°E – The JTWC downgrades Son-Tinh to a tropical disturbance for the final time as it further weakens.
  - At 18.7°N 136.6°E – The JTWC upgrades 15W to a tropical storm as it continue to moves northwards.
- 12:00 UTC
  - At 19.7°N 136.7°E – The JMA follows suit, upgrading 15W to a tropical storm, assigning it the name Jongdari.
  - At 41.6°N 120.2°E – The JTWC last notes Tropical Depression Ampil.
- 18:00 UTC
  - At 23.6°N 107.6°E – The JMA last notes Tropical Depression Son-Tinh as it dissipates over South China; the system fully dissipated six hours later.
  - At 20.2°N 136.6°E – The JTWC assesses Jongdari has briefly peaked with maximum 1-minute winds of 45 knots (83 km/h; 52 mph) and a central pressure of 994 hPa (994.0 mbar; 29.35 inHg).

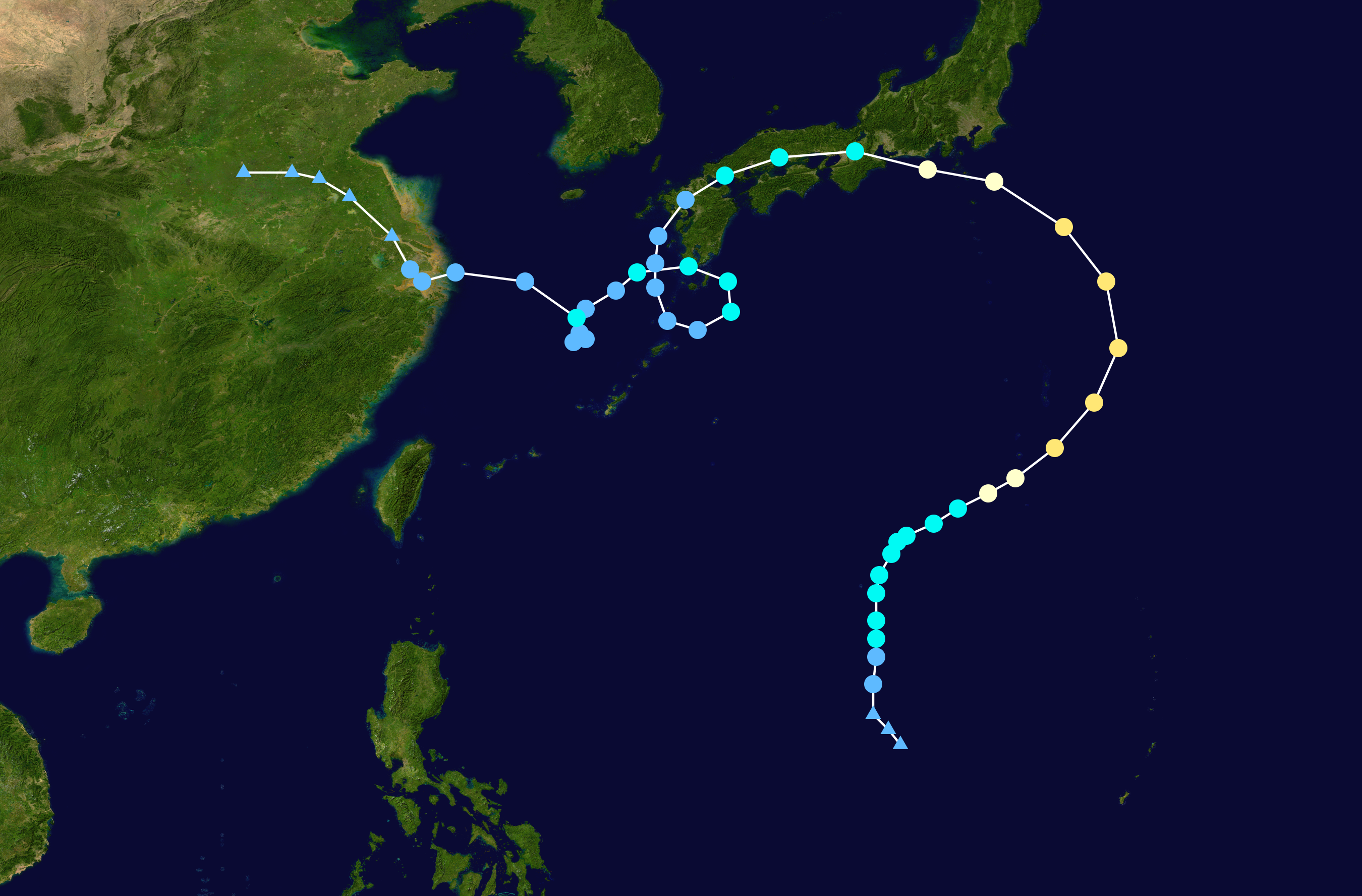
Track of Jongdari during late July to early August.

July 25

- 00:00 UTC
  - At 45.1°N 124.5°E – The JMA assesses that Ampil has transitioned into an extratropical cyclone over the northern part of China.
  - At 32.7°N 158.2°E – Wukong further intensifies to a severe tropical storm, subsequently peaking with 10-minute winds of 50 knots (93 km/h; 58 mph) and a central pressure of 990 hPa (990.0 mbar; 29.23 inHg) as it accelerated north-northwestwards.
- 06:00 UTC at 33.9°N 157.8°E – The JTWC further upgrades Wukong to a Category 1 typhoon, subsequently peaking with 1-minute winds of 65 knots (120 km/h; 75 mph) and a central pressure of 974 hPa (974.0 mbar; 28.76 inHg).
- 12:00 UTC
  - At 21.8°N 137.3°E – The JMA further upgrades Jongdari to a severe tropical storm as it slowly turns eastward.
  - At 35.3°N 157.3°E – The JTWC reports Wukong has weakened back to a tropical storm.
- 18:00 UTC at 37.0°N 156.0°E – The JMA follows suit, downgrading Wukong to a tropical storm now east of Japan.

July 26

- 06:00 UTC at 47.5°N 137.8°E – The JMA last notes the extratropical remnants of Ampil with the system dissipating over Primorsky Krai six hours later.
- 12:00 UTC at 23.5°N 140.3°E – The JTWC upgrades Jongdari to a Category 1 typhoon southwest of the Ogasawara Islands.
- 18:00 UTC
  - At 23.9°N 141.1°E – The JMA also upgrades Jongdari to a typhoon as it moves northeastwards.
  - At 43.0°N 152.0°E – The JTWC downgrades Wukong further to a tropical depression as it starts to turn to the northeast.

July 27

- 00:00 UTC
  - At 25.0°N 142.4°E – The JMA estimates that Jongdari has attained its peak intensity with 10-minute sustained winds of 75 knots (139 km/h; 86 mph) and a central pressure of 960 hPa (960.0 mbar; 28.35 inHg).
  - At 44.3°N 152.2°E – The JMA reports that Wukong has transitioned into an extratropical cyclone near the Kuril Islands.
  - At 44.5°N 152.1°E – The JTWC downgrades Wukong to a tropical disturbance as it is about to become extratropical while moving northeastwards.
  - at 25.0°N 142.5°E – The JTWC further upgrades Jongdari to a Category 2-equivalent typhoon on the SSHWS.
- 06:00 UTC
  - At 45.9°N 153.2°E – The JTWC assesses that Wukong has transitioned into an extratropical cyclone.
  - At 26.5°N 143.8°E – The JTWC reports that Jongdari has reached its highest 1-minute winds of 90 knots (170 km/h; 100 mph) as it starts to curve northwards.
- 12:00 UTC at 47.9°N 155.7°E – The JMA last notes the extratropical remnants of Wukong; the system dissipates six hours later.
- 18:00 UTC at 30.5°N 144.2°E – The JTWC reports that Jongdari has reached its lowest central pressure of 960 hPa (960.0 mbar; 28.35 inHg) as it now curves northwestwards towards Japan.

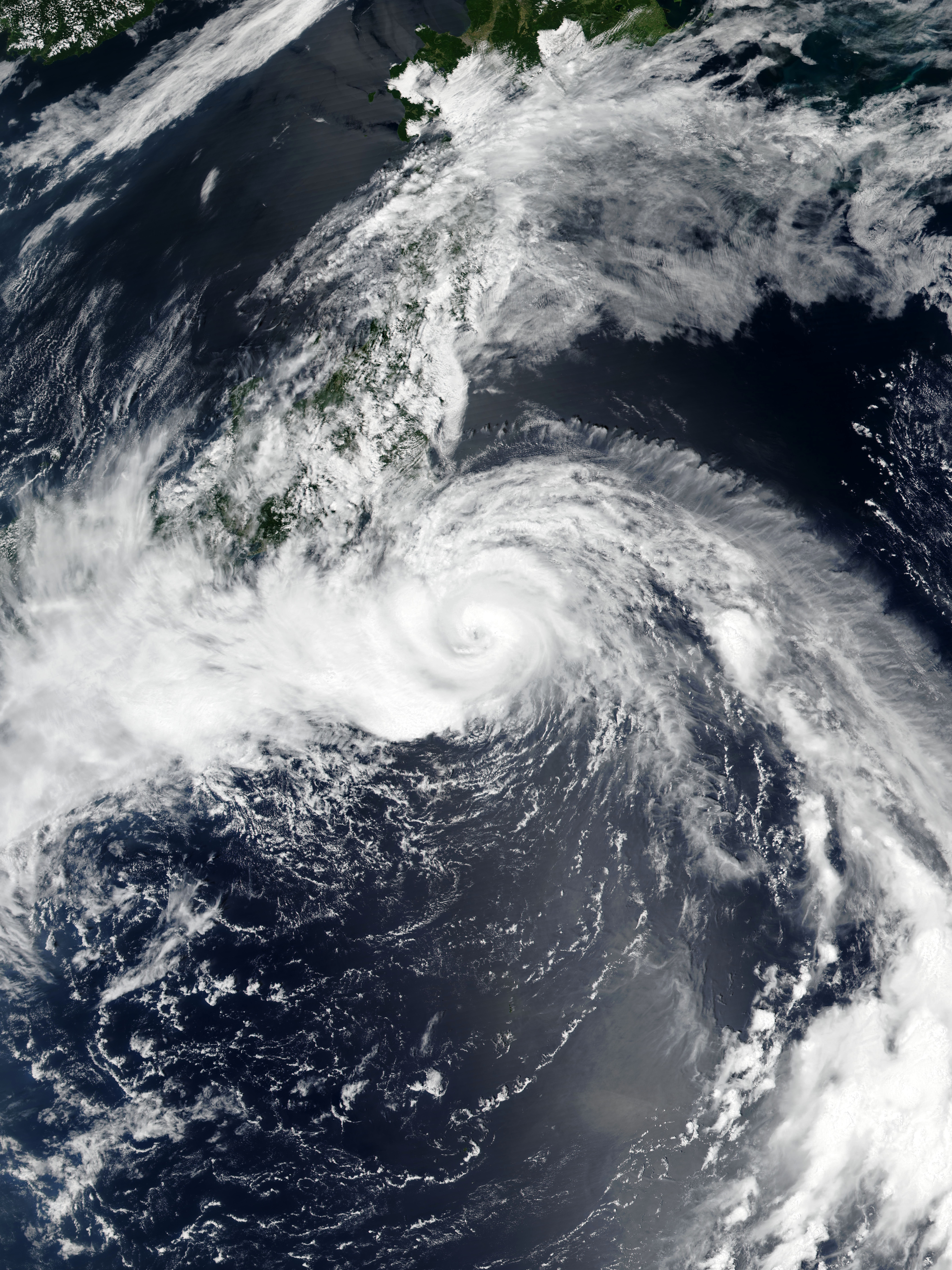
Jongdari closing in on Japan on the early hours of July 28.

July 28

- 06:00 UTC at 33.8°N 140.5°E – The JTWC reports Jongdari has weakened to a Category 1 typhoon as it closes in on Honshu from the west.
- 16:00 UTC (01:00 JST, July 29) at 34.5°N 136.7°E – Typhoon Jongdari makes its first landfall on Ise City, Mie Prefecture.
- 18:00 UTC
  - At 34.6°N 135.8°E – The JMA downgrades Jongdari to a severe tropical storm after making landfall.
  - At 34.8°N 135.9°E – The JTWC follows suit, downgrading Jongdari to a tropical storm as it traverses Honshu while curving westwards to west-southwestwards.

July 29

- 00:00 UTC at 34.6°N 133.3°E – The JMA downgrades Jongdari to a tropical storm as it continues to move west-southwestwards.
- Before 09:00 UTC (18:00 JST) at 33.6°N 131.0°E – Tropical Storm Jongdari makes its second landfall on Buzen City, Fukuoka Prefecture on the island of Kyushu.
- 12:00 UTC at 33.2°N 130.3°E – The JTWC further downgrades Jongdari to a tropical depression as it moves south-southwestward.

July 30

- 06:00 UTC at 27.4°N 152.5°E – The JTWC reports the formation of a tropical depression east of the Ogasawara Islands, designating it 16W.
- 12:00 UTC
  - At 29.2°N 129.7°E – After emerging over the East China Sea, Jongdari weakens to a tropical depression as it turns southeastward.
  - At 28.4°N 152.5°E – The JTWC assesses 16W having 1-minute winds of 30 knots (56 km/h; 35 mph) and a central pressure of 1,000 hPa (1,000 mbar; 29.53 inHg) which served as its peak as a tropical system.

July 31

- 00:00 UTC
  - At 29.8°N 131.7°E – The JMA re-upgrades Jongdari to a tropical storm, turning northwards.
  - At 31.3°N 152.3°E – The JMA starts tracking 16W as a tropical depression with 10-minute winds of 30 knots (56 km/h; 35 mph) as the system moves northwards.
  - At 29.5°N 131.8°E – The JTWC reports Jongdari has regained tropical storm status, with 1-minute winds of 35 knots (65 km/h; 40 mph) and a central pressure of 993 hPa (993.0 mbar; 29.32 inHg).
- 06:00 UTC at 31.3°N 152.3°E – The JMA assesses 16W has attained its lowest central pressure of 1,002 hPa (1,002 mbar; 29.59 inHg).
- 12:00 UTC at 30.8°N 130.3°E – The JMA assesses Jongdari has reached a secondary peak with 10-minute winds of 40 knots (74 km/h; 46 mph) and a central pressure of 985 hPa (985.0 mbar; 29.09 inHg) just as it is about to finish a counter-clockwise loop around Yakushima Island.

=== August ===
August 1

- 00:00 UTC at 30.2°N 128.0°E – The JTWC downgrades Jongdari again to a tropical depression as it dives southwestward over the East China Sea.
- 06:00 UTC at 35.3°N 149.5°E – The JTWC reports 16W has transitioned to a subtropical depression as the system starts to turn northeastward.

August 2

- 00:00 UTC at 37.0°N 151.7°E – The JMA assesses Ex-16W has turned extratropical.
- 06:00 UTC
  - At 18.1°N 152.0°E – The JMA begins tracking a tropical depression southwest of Minami-Tori-shima.
  - At 38°N 153°E – The JMA last notes the extratropical remnants of Ex-16W as it becomes absorbed by another extratropical low to its north; the system becomes indistinguishable six hours later.
  - At 29.3°N 126.7°E – After Jongdari had done another counter-clockwise loop, the JTWC reports the system re-intensified to a tropical storm, with 1-minute winds of 35 knots (65 km/h; 40 mph) and a central pressure of 990 hPa (990.0 mbar; 29.23 inHg).
- 12:00 UTC at 30.5°N 125.0°E – The JTWC downgrades Jongdari to a tropical depression for the final time as it heads westwards towards China.
- 18:00 UTC at 17.9°N 151.4°E – The JTWC designates the tropical depression southwest of Minami-Tori-shima as 17W.

August 3

- 00:00 UTC
  - At 30.6°N 121.5°E – The JMA downgrades Jongdari again to a tropical depression as it is about to make landfall on China.
  - At 17.7°N 150.9°E – The JMA upgrades 17W to a tropical storm, assigning it the name Shanshan as it slowly moves northwestward.
- 02:30 UTC (10:30 CST) at 30.8°N 121.3°E – Jongdari makes its third and final landfall on Jinshan District, Shanghai.
- 06:00 UTC at 18.1°N 150.5°E – The JTWC upgrades Shanshan to a tropical storm, now moving north-northwestwards.
- 12:00 UTC
  - At 32.0°N 120.6°E – The JTWC downgrades Jongdari further to a tropical disturbance as it moves further inland.
  - At 18.2°N 150.3°E – Shanshan further intensifies to a severe tropical storm, per the JMA.
- 18:00 UTC at 26.5°N 176.1°E – The JTWC upgrades a tropical disturbance tagged 95W near the International Date Line to a subtropical depression.

August 4

- 00:00 UTC at 27.5°N 176.5°E – The JTWC upgrades 95W to a subtropical storm, estimating maximum 1-minute sustained winds of 35 knots (65 km/h; 40 mph) and a central pressure of 996 hPa (996.0 mbar; 29.41 inHg) as it turns to the northwest.
- 06:00 UTC
  - At 20.9°N 148.7°E – The JMA upgrades Shanshan further to a typhoon.
  - At 20.9°N 148.8°E – The JTWC assesses Shanshan to have intensified as a Category 1 typhoon.
- 12:00 UTC at 34.1°N 115.7°E – The JMA last notes Jongdari as it dissipates over Central China, with the system indistinguishable six hours later.
- 18:00 UTC
  - At 22.5°N 147.7°E – The JMA estimates that Shanshan has peaked in intensity with 10-minute winds of 70 knots (130 km/h; 81 mph) and a central pressure of 970 hPa (970.0 mbar; 28.64 inHg), maintaining it for the next few days.
  - At 22.4°N 147.7°E – The JTWC assesses Shanshan has attained initial peak 1-minute winds of 75 knots (139 km/h; 86 mph) as it continues to move northwestward.

August 5

- 06:00 UTC at 35.8°N 172.1°E – The JTWC assesses that Subtropical Storm 95W has transitioned to an extratropical cyclone.
- 12:00 UTC at 24.8°N 147.1°E – The JTWC assesses Shanshan has attained its initial lowest central pressure of 967 hPa (967.0 mbar; 28.56 inHg).

August 6

- 00:00 UTC (08:00 PHT) at 18.2°N 134.1°E – The JMA and PAGASA begins tracking a tropical depression in the Philippine Sea with the latter giving it the local name Karding.
- 12:00 UTC at 18.7°N 133.4°E – The JTWC begins tracking Karding, designating it 18W.

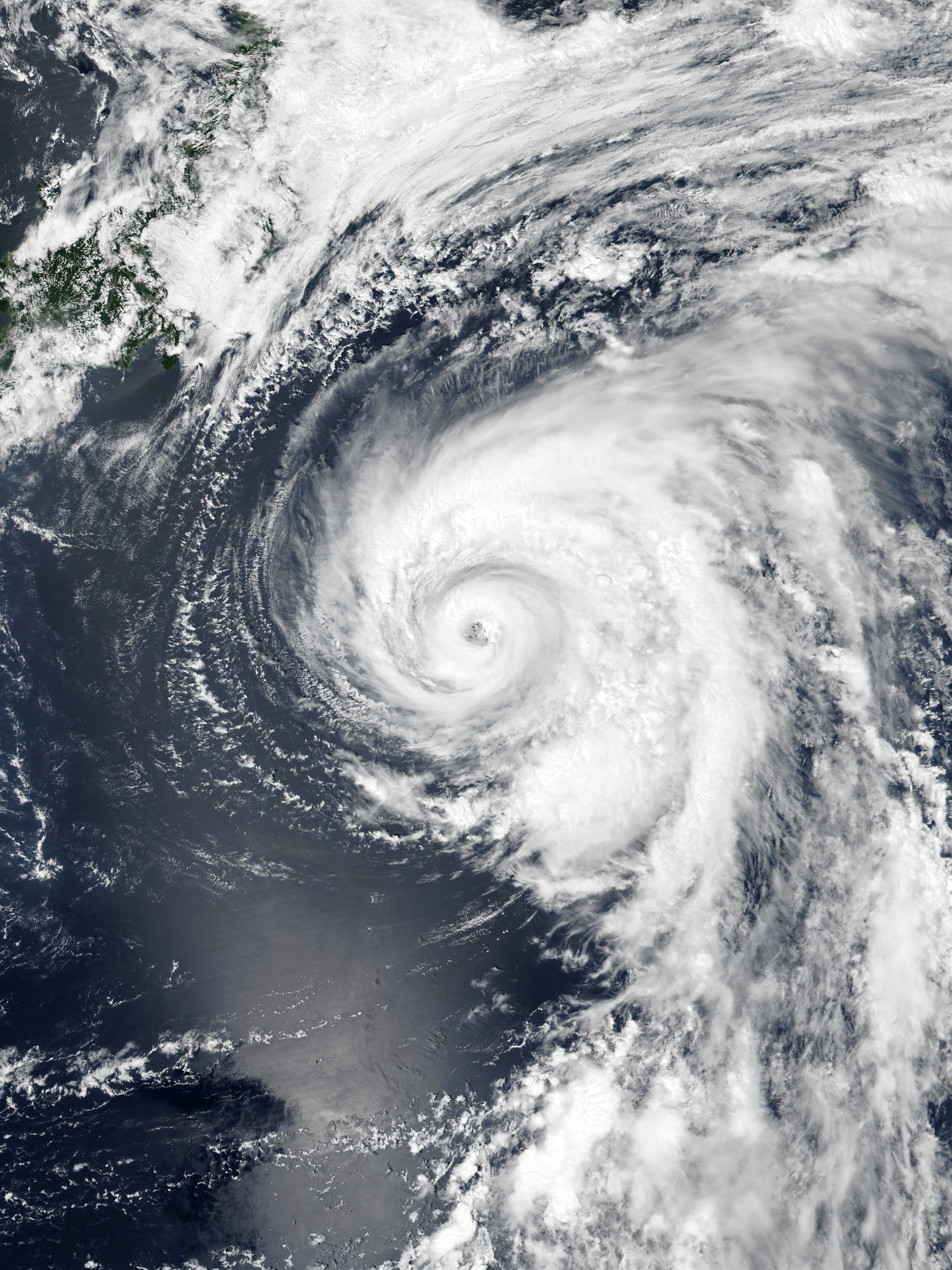
Shanshan at its peak intensity on August 7.

August 7

- 00:00 UTC at 18.8°N 132.9°E – The JTWC assesses 18W (Karding) has briefly deepened with a central pressure of 995 hPa (995.0 mbar; 29.38 inHg).
- 06:00 UTC at 31.2°N 143.9°E – After briefly weakening, Shanshan strengthens to a Category 2-equivalent typhoon, with the JTWC assessing its best peak with maximum 1-minute sustained winds of 85 knots (157 km/h; 98 mph) and a central pressure of 953 hPa (953.0 mbar; 28.14 inHg).
- 12:00 UTC
  - At 32.0°N 143.1°E – The JTWC downgrades Shanshan back to a Category 1-equivalent typhoon on the SSHWS as it nears Japan.
  - At 18.9°N 132.5°E – The JTWC assesses 18W (Karding) has briefly deepened again to a central pressure of 995 hPa (995.0 mbar; 29.38 inHg) as its sustained winds slowly increase.

August 8

- 00:00 UTC
  - (08:00 PHT) at 19.2°N 132.5°E – The JMA and PAGASA upgrades 18W (Karding) to a tropical storm, with the former assigning it the name Yagi; the system's 10-minute winds of 35 knots (65 km/h; 40 mph) and a central pressure of 994 hPa (994.0 mbar; 29.35 inHg) would be its peak intensity inside the latter's area or responsibility.
  - At 19.3°N 132.6°E – The JTWC follows suit, upgrading Yagi (Karding) to a tropical storm as it slowly turns northeast over the Philippine Sea.
- 06:00 UTC at 19.5°N 133.4°E – The JTWC assesses Yagi (Karding) has briefly deepened to a lower central pressure of 993 hPa (993.0 mbar; 29.32 inHg).
- 18:00 UTC at 35.3°N 141.0°E – The JTWC downgrades Shanshan to a tropical storm as it makes its close approach to Japan.

August 9

- 00:00 UTC at 36.2°N 141.1°E – The JMA downgrades Shanshan to a severe tropical storm just east of Ibaraki Prefecture.
- 06:00 UTC at 20.8°N 133.5°E – The JTWC assesses Yagi (Karding) has attained 1-minute winds of 40 knots (74 km/h; 46 mph) momentarily as it turns towards the northwest.
- 12:00 UTC at 21.3°N 133.5°E – The JTWC assesses Yagi (Karding) has also deepened to a much lower central pressure of 991 hPa (991.0 mbar; 29.26 inHg).
- 18:00 UTC
  - At 39.1°N 144.1°E – The JMA further downgrades Shanshan to a tropical storm as it starts to pull away from Japan.
  - At 19.9°N 111.6°E – The JMA begins tracking a tropical depression east of Hainan.

August 10

- 00:00 UTC at 40.0°N 147.1°E – The JTWC downgrades Shanshan to a tropical depression as it turns extratropical.
- 01:00 UTC (09:00 CST) at 19.2°N 110.5°E – The tropical depression hits Qionghai City, Hainan.
- 06:00 UTC
  - At 41.0°N 151.0°E – The JMA assesses that Shanshan has transitioned into an extratropical cyclone.
  - At 41.0°N 151.2°E – The JTWC also assesses that Shanshan has turned extratropical.
- 12:00 UTC
  - At 17.5°N 145.0°E – The JMA begins tracking a tropical depression to the west of the Mariana Islands.
  - At 17.1°N 145.2°E – The JTWC begins tracking the tropical depression near the Marianas, designating it 19W.
  - At 23.3°N 131.9°E – Tropical Storm Yagi (Karding)'s central pressure continues to fluctuate as it attains a low central pressure of 992 hPa (992.0 mbar; 29.29 inHg) per the JTWC.

August 11

- 00:00 UTC at 18.4°N 144.5°E – The JTWC upgrades 19W to a tropical storm as it steadily moves northwest.
- 01:00 UTC (09:00 PHT) – PAGASA announces Yagi (Karding) has exited the PAR.
- 02:35 UTC (10:35 CST) at 21.6°N 111.9°E – After emerging back over the South China Sea, the tropical depression makes another landfall on Hailing Island, Yangjiang, Guangdong.
- 06:00 UTC at 40.6°N 169.4°E – The JMA last notes the extratropical remnants of Shanshan as it quickly moves eastward with the system fully dissipating six hours later.
- 12:00 UTC
  - At 25.0°N 126.8°E – The JMA estimates that Yagi has peaked in intensity with 10-minute sustained winds of 40 knots (74 km/h; 46 mph) and a central pressure of 990 hPa (990.0 mbar; 29.23 inHg).
  - At 24.9°N 126.9°E – Tropical Storm Yagi's central pressure briefly fell to a central pressure of 989 hPa (989.0 mbar; 29.21 inHg) per the JTWC as the system moves westward near the Ryukyus.
  - At 19.7°N 143.4°E – The JMA upgrades 19W to a tropical storm, assigning it the name Leepi.
  - At 21.6°N 111.8°E – The JTWC begins tracking the tropical depression over China, designating it 20W as it emerges back over water.

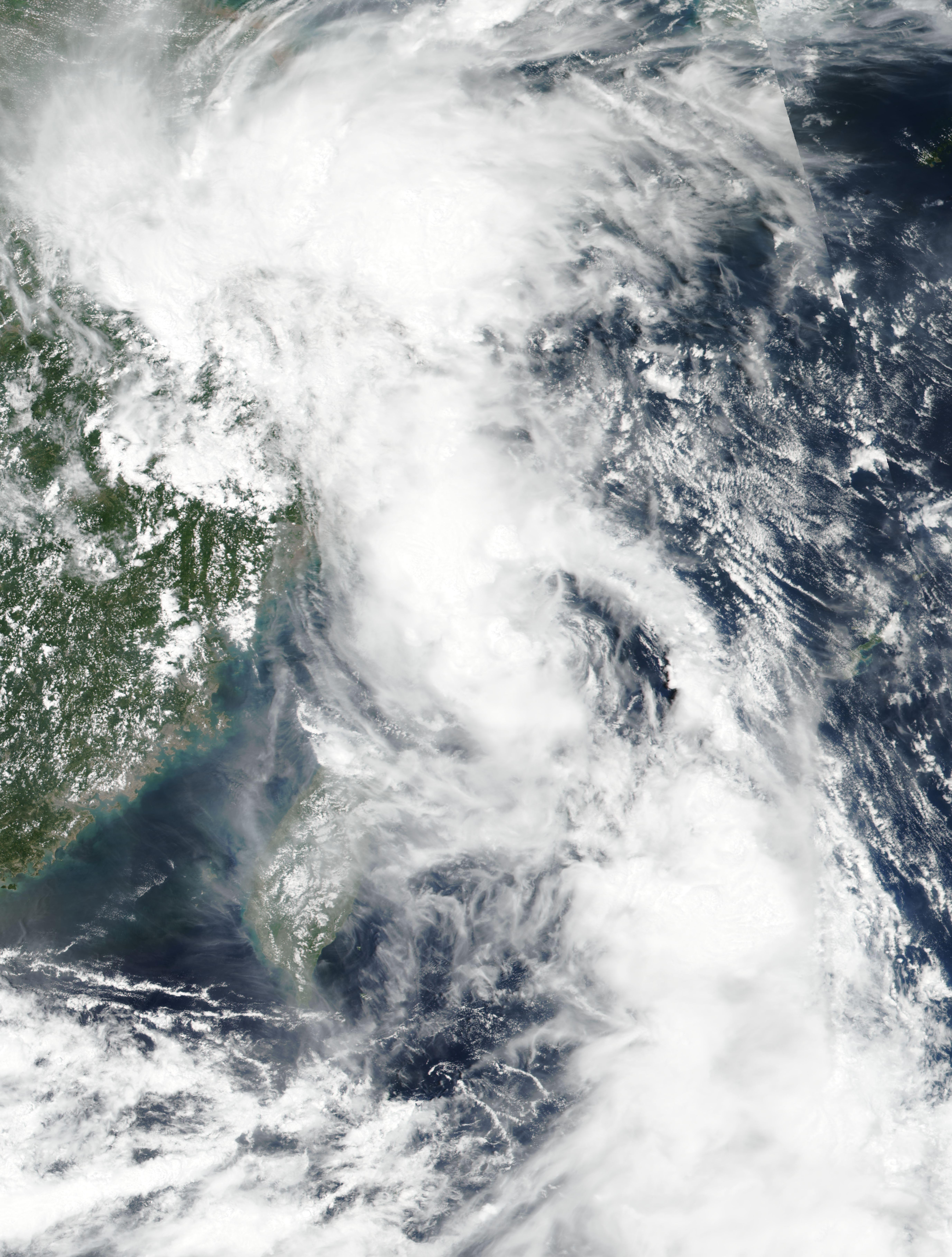
Yagi hours before making landfall in China on August 12.

August 12

- 12:00 UTC
  - At 27.8°N 122.3°E – The JTWC estimates that Yagi has peaked in intensity with 1-minute winds of 45 knots (83 km/h; 52 mph) and a central pressure of 983 hPa (983.0 mbar; 29.03 inHg) as it nears the Chinese coastline.
  - At 20.6°N 112.4°E – The JTWC further upgrades 20W to a tropical storm as it turns eastward.
  - At 23.7°N 141.5°E – The JTWC upgrades Leepi to a Category 1 typhoon, attaining its peak 1-minute sustained winds of 65 knots (120 km/h; 75 mph).
- 15:35 UTC (23:35 CST) at 28.4°N 121.4°E – Tropical Storm Yagi makes landfall on Wenling, Zhejiang.
- 18:00 UTC at 24.7°N 140.6°E – The JTWC estimates that Leepi has deepened with a central pressure of 982 hPa (982.0 mbar; 29.00 inHg).

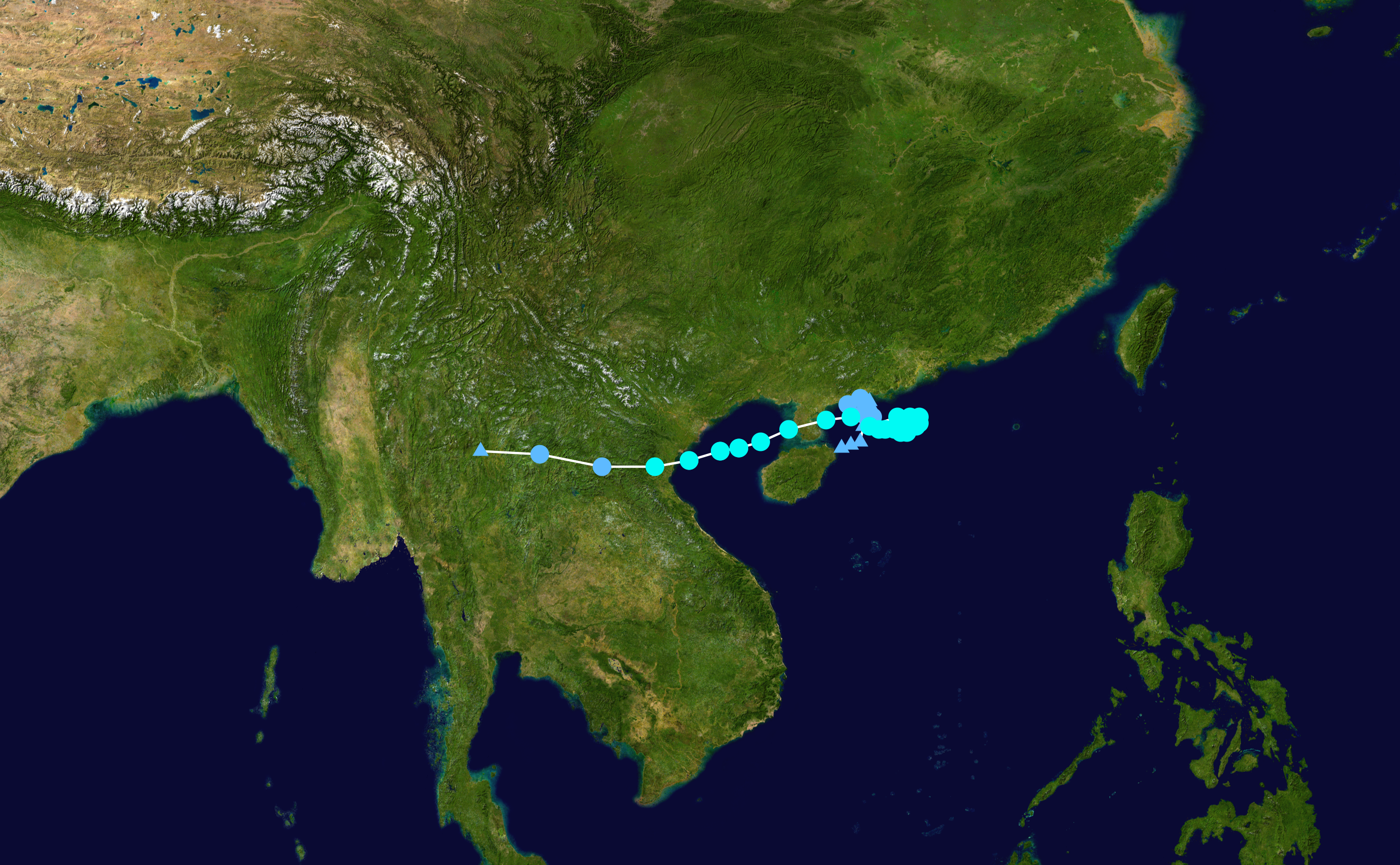
Track of Bebinca during mid-August.

August 13

- 00:00 UTC
  - At 20.6°N 112.9°E – The JMA upgrades 20W to a tropical storm, assigning it the name Bebinca.
  - At 25.7°N 139.5°E – The JTWC downgrades Leepi back to a tropical storm as it continues its northwestward track while passing near the Ogasawara Islands.
  - At 30.7°N 118.9°E – The JMA downgrades Yagi to a tropical depression as it moves further inland.
  - At 30.5°N 119.3°E – The JTWC downgrades Yagi to a tropical depression while its central pressure briefly deepened to 993 hPa (993.0 mbar; 29.32 inHg).
- 06:00 UTC at 26.5°N 138.6°E – The JMA upgrades Leepi to a severe tropical storm, attaining its peak with 10-minute sustained winds of 50 knots (93 km/h; 58 mph) and a minimum central pressure of 994 hPa (994.0 mbar; 29.35 inHg).
- 12:00 UTC at 27.3°N 137.6°E – The JTWC estimates that Leepi has briefly deepened to a central pressure of 988 hPa (988.0 mbar; 29.18 inHg).
- After 15:00 UTC – Tropical Storm Hector crosses into the Western Paific basin.
- 18:00 UTC
  - At 25.8°N 178.9°E – The JMA analyzes Hector to have 10-minute winds of 40 knots (74 km/h; 46 mph) and a minimum central pressure of 998 hPa (998.0 mbar; 29.47 inHg) upon entering the basin.
  - At 25.4°N 178.7°E – The JTWC assesses Hector to have 1-minute winds of 40 knots (74 km/h; 46 mph) and a minimum central pressure of 1,005 hPa (1,005 mbar; 29.68 inHg) as it weakens.

August 14

- 00:00 UTC at 22.9°N 128.7°E – The JMA begins tracking a tropical depression south of Okinawa.
- 06:00 UTC
  - At 21.0°N 113.7°E – The JTWC assesses Bebinca has deepened with a central pressure of 987 hPa (987.0 mbar; 29.15 inHg) after recurving back towards the west.
  - At 37.0°N 116.7°E – The JTWC assesses that Yagi has transitioned into an extratropical cyclone while moving northeastward inland.
  - At 26.3°N 175.9°E – The JTWC further downgrades Hector to a tropical depression as it continues to move west-northwestward.
- 15:00 UTC at 31.8°N 132.4°E – The JMA downgrades Leepi to a tropical storm as it nears landfall on Japan.
- 17:30 UTC (02:30 JST, August 15) at 32.4°N 131.6°E – Tropical Storm Leepi makes landfall on Hyūga, Miyazaki.
- 18:00 UTC
  - At 27.9°N 172.6°E – The JTWC upgrades Hector back to a tropical storm, re-attaing peak 1-minute winds of 40 knots (74 km/h; 46 mph) and a slightly lower central pressure of 1,004 hPa (1,004 mbar; 29.65 inHg).
  - At 26.1°N 127.5°E – The JTWC begins tracking the Okinawa tropical depression, designating it 21W.

August 15

- 00:00 UTC
  - At 33.9°N 130.0°E – The JMA downgrades Leepi to a tropical depression as it emerges over the Korea Strait.
  - At 28.7°N 170.8°E – The JTWC reclassifies Hector to a subtropical storm.
- 06:00 UTC
  - At 37.9°N 119.7°E – The JMA assesses that Yagi has transitioned into an extratropical cyclone after emerging over the Bohai Sea.
  - At 34.9°N 129.4°E – The JTWC downgrades Leepi to a tropical depression.
  - At 28.2°N 126.9°E – The JMA upgrades 21W to a tropical storm, assigning it the name Rumbia.
  - At 11.7°N 144.7°E – The JMA begins tracking a tropical depression south of Guam with a central pressure of 1,000 hPa (1,000 mbar; 29.53 inHg) before briefly rising again.
- Between 06:00-12:00 UTC (15:00-21:00 KST) – Tropical Depression Leepi clips the southwestern part of the Korean Peninsula.
- 12:00 UTC
  - At 35.7°N 129.3°E – The JMA last notes Leepi as it emerges over the Sea of Japan; the system fully dissipates at 18:00 UTC.
  - At 35.9°N 129.5°E – The JTWC assesses that Leepi has transitioned into a post-tropical cyclone.
  - At 29.9°N 167.9°E – The JMA downgrades Hector to a tropical depression north of Wake Island.
  - At 29.8°N 167.9°E – The JTWC downgrades Hector to a subtropical depression.
  - At 29.0°N 125.9°E – The JTWC upgrades Rumbia to a tropical storm as it steers to the west.
  - At 12.7°N 144.4°E – The JTWC begins tracking the Guam tropical depression, designating it 22W as it moves northwestward.
- 13:40 UTC (21:40 CST) at 20.9°N 110.1°E – Tropical Storm Bebinca makes its third landfall on Leizhou, Zhanjiang, Guangdong.

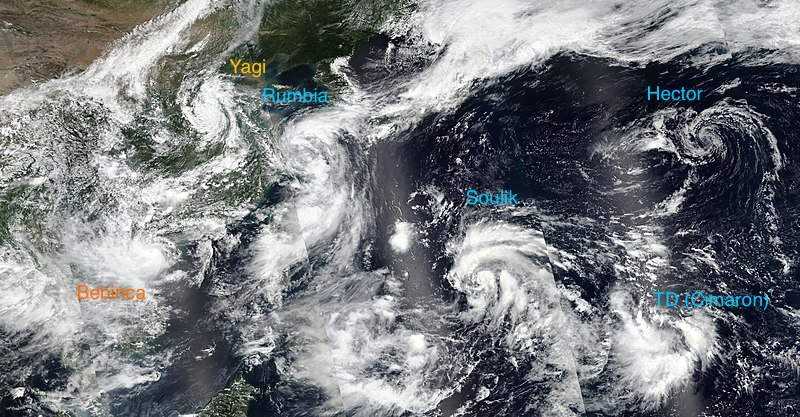
Six tropical systems active over the North Western Pacific basin on August 16. The remnants of Leepi (unlabelled) is also present over the Sea of Japan.

August 16

- 00:00 UTC
  - At 15.6°N 143.0°E – The JMA upgrades 22W to a tropical storm, assigning it the name Soulik.
  - At 15.2°N 143.3°E – The JTWC also upgrades Soulik to a tropical storm.
  - At 31.5°N 166.4°E – The JTWC assesses that Hector has briefly deepened, with a central pressure of 1,008 hPa (1,008 mbar; 29.77 inHg) as it starts to recurve.
  - At 35.3°N 116.1°E – The JMA last notes the extratropical remains of Yagi as it moves back inland; the system dissipates over northern China six hours later.
- 06:00 UTC
  - At 20.1°N 107.9°E – The JMA estimates that Bebinca has peaked in intensity with 10-minute sustained winds of 45 knots (83 km/h; 52 mph) and a central pressure of 985 hPa (985.0 mbar; 29.09 inHg) after having emerged over the Gulf of Tonkin.
  - At 20.0°N 107.9°E – The JTWC estimates that Bebinca has attained peak 1-minute sustained winds of 60 knots (110 km/h; 69 mph) as it heads west-southwestward.
  - At 32.3°N 165.8°E – The JTWC downgrades Hector to a tropical disturbance.
- 12:00 UTC
  - At 30.5°N 122.9°E – The JMA estimates that Rumbia has peaked in intensity with 10-minute sustained winds of 45 knots (83 km/h; 52 mph) and a central pressure of 985 hPa (985.0 mbar; 29.09 inHg).
  - At 30.3°N 123.0°E – The JTWC estimates that Rumbia has attained its lowest central pressure of 978 hPa (978.0 mbar; 28.88 inHg) as it nears China.
  - At 19.9°N 107.3°E – The JTWC estimates that Bebinca has attained its lowest central pressure at 979 hPa (979.0 mbar; 28.91 inHg) as it nears Vietnam.
  - At 11.3°N 160.3°E – The JMA begins tracking a tropical depression near the Marshall Islands.
- 18:00 UTC
  - At 30.7°N 121.8°E – The JTWC estimates that Rumbia has peaked in intensity with 1-minute sustained winds of 50 knots (93 km/h; 58 mph).
  - At 11.7°N 159.6°E – The tropical depression near the Marshall Islands slightly deepened to a central pressure of 1,006 hPa (1,006 mbar; 29.71 inHg) before rising again, per the JMA.
  - At 33.6°N 165.7°E – The JMA last notes Hector as it dissipated the next day.
- 20:00 UTC (04:00 CST, August 17) at 31.2°N 121.5°E – Tropical Storm Rumbia makes landfall on Pudong, Shanghai.
- 22:30 UTC (05:30 ICT, August 17) at 19.4°N 105.8°E – Tropical Storm Bebinca makes its fourth and final landfall on Nghi Sơn, Thanh Hóa Province.

August 17

- 00:00 UTC
  - At 21.4°N 141.0°E – The JMA upgrades Soulik to a severe tropical storm as it continues moving northwestward.
  - At 22.0°N 140.8°E – The JTWC further upgrades Soulik to a Category 1 typhoon.
- 06:00 UTC
  - At 19.0°N 104.0°E – The JMA downgrades Bebinca to a tropical depression while moving further inland.
  - At 19.4°N 103.5°E – The JTWC downgrades Bebinca to a tropical depression as it moves over Laos.
  - At 12.6°N 158.1°E – The JTWC begins tracking the Marshall Islands tropical depression, designating it 23W.
  - At 12.2°N 158.1°E – The JMA assesses 23W's central pressure fluctuated back to 1,006 hPa (1,006 mbar; 29.71 inHg) before rising again.
- 12:00 UTC at 23.8°N 140.2°E – The JMA further upgrades Soulik to a typhoon as it slows down near the Ogasawara Islands.
- 18:00 UTC
  - At 19.8°N 100.3°E – The JMA last notes Bebinca with its remnants dissipating over Laos the next day.
  - At 19.9°N 99.6°E – The JTWC further downgrades Bebinca to a tropical disturbance.
  - At 31.9°N 116.2°E – The JTWC downgrades Rumbia to a tropical depression as it moves further inland.
  - At 24.3°N 140.0°E – The JTWC further upgrades Soulik to a Category 2-equivalent typhoon on the SSHWS.

August 18

- 00:00 UTC at 32.2°N 115.3°E – The JMA downgrades Rumbia to a tropical depression as it moves over China.
- 06:00 UTC
  - At 32.9°N 115.1°E – The JTWC downgrades Rumbia to a tropical disturbance as it dissipates.
  - At 24.8°N 140.0°E – The JMA estimates that Soulik has initially peaked with 10-minute sustained winds of 80 knots (150 km/h; 92 mph) and a central pressure of 955 hPa (955.0 mbar; 28.20 inHg).
  - At 24.8°N 140.1°E – The JTWC assesses Soulik has initially peaked as a Category 3-equivalent typhoon with 1-minute sustained winds of 105 knots (194 km/h; 121 mph) and a central pressure of 943 hPa (943.0 mbar; 27.85 inHg).
  - At 14.0°N 154.5°E – The JTWC upgrades 23W to a tropical storm as it moves northwestward.
- 12:00 UTC
  - At 24.9°N 139.9°E – Typhoon Soulik weakens back to a Category 2-equivalent typhoon as it slowly turns west-northwestward.
  - At 14.0°N 153.9°E – The JMA upgrades 23W to a tropical storm, assigning it the name Cimaron.

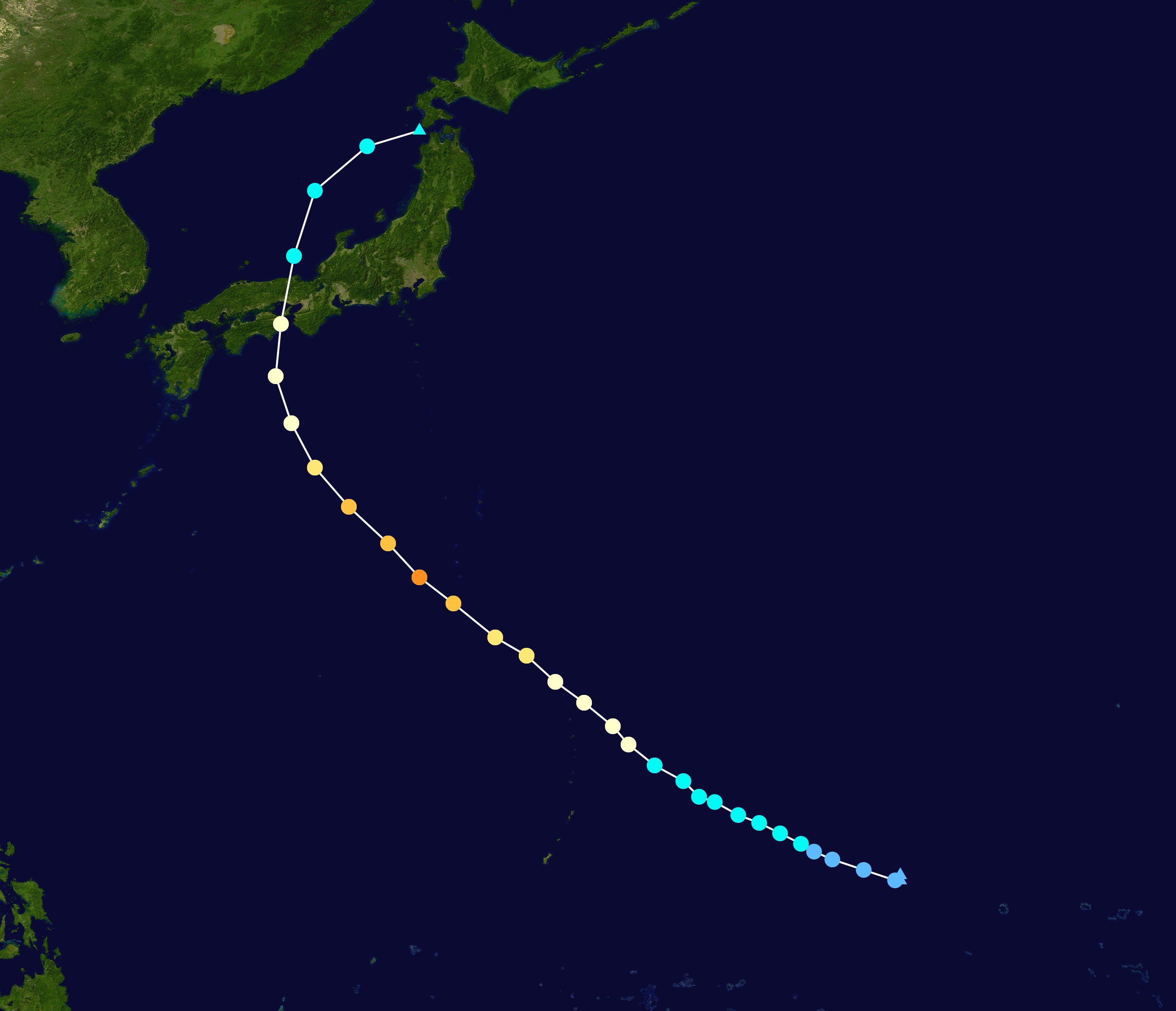
Track of Cimaron during mid-late August.

August 19

- 12:00 UTC
  - At 25.2°N 138.0°E – The JTWC further downgrades Soulik to a Category 1-equivalent typhoon as it steadily gains speed.
  - At 15.8°N 150.9°E – The JMA further upgrades Cimaron to a severe tropical storm.
  - At 32.1°N 116.4°E – The JMA last notes Rumbia after it had recurved over China; it fully dissipated six hours later south of the Yellow River.
- 18:00 UTC at 25.5°N 137.3°E – Soulik rebounds back to a Category 2-equivalent typhoon.

August 20

- 06:00 UTC
  - At 26.1°N 135.5°E – The JTWC re-upgrades Soulik to a Category 3-equivalent typhoon as it moves towards the Ryukyu Islands.
  - At 17.8°N 147.9°E – The JTWC upgrades Cimaron to a Category 1 typhoon as it moves near the Northern Mariana Islands.
- 12:00 UTC at 18.5°N 147.3°E – The JTWC assesses Cimaron has attained an initial peak of 1-minute winds of 70 knots (130 km/h; 81 mph) and a central pressure of 976 hPa (976.0 mbar; 28.82 inHg) before slightly weakening.
- 18:00 UTC at 27.0°N 133.3°E – The JMA estimates that Soulik has peaked in intensity with 10-minute sustained winds of 85 knots (157 km/h; 98 mph) and a minimum central pressure of 950 hPa (950.0 mbar; 28.05 inHg). In addition, the JTWC assesses the typhoon has re-attained its peak 1-minute winds of 105 knots (194 km/h; 121 mph) but with a slightly lower central pressure at 942 hPa (942.0 mbar; 27.82 inHg).

August 21

- 00:00 UTC at 20.1°N 145.1°E – The JMA upgrades Cimaron to a typhoon as it passes north of the Marianas.
- 06:00 UTC
  - At 28.4°N 130.9°E – The JTWC downgrades Soulik back to a Category 2-equivalent typhoon as it moves west-northwestward.
  - At 21.2°N 144.0°E – The JTWC upgrades Cimaron to a Category 2-equivalent typhoon on the SSHWS as it moves northwestward.
- 18:00 UTC
  - At 23.2°N 141.2°E – The JTWC further upgrades Cimaron to a Category 3-equivalent typhoon on the SSHWS.
  - At 29.8°N 128.6°E – The JTWC assesses Soulik has regained some strength with 1-minute winds of 95 knots (176 km/h; 109 mph) with a central pressure of 948 hPa (948.0 mbar; 27.99 inHg) as it enters the East China Sea.

August 22

- 00:00 UTC
  - At 24.2°N 139.9°E – The JTWC upgrades Cimaron to a Category 4-equivalent typhoon, peaking with 1-minute sustained winds of 115 knots (213 km/h; 132 mph) and a central pressure of 936 hPa (936.0 mbar; 27.64 inHg).
  - At 22°N 119°E – The JMA begins tracking a tropical depression in the South China Sea.
- 06:00 UTC
  - At 25.5°N 138.8°E – The JMA estimates that Cimaron has peaked in intensity with 10-minute sustained winds of 85 knots (157 km/h; 98 mph) and a central pressure of 950 hPa (950.0 mbar; 28.05 inHg) as it passes west of the Ogasawara Islands.
  - At 25.5°N 138.7°E – The JTWC downgrades Cimaron back to a Category 3-equivalent typhoon on the SSHWS.
- 12:00 UTC at 31.8°N 126.2°E – The JTWC downgrades Soulik to a Category 1-equivalent typhoon on the SSHWS as it turns more to the north.
- 18:00 UTC
  - At 28.4°N 135.9°E – The JTWC downgrades Cimaron to a Category 2-equivalent typhoon as it turns more north towards Japan.
  - (02:00 PHT, August 23) at 22.3°N 120.0°E – The JTWC and PAGASA begin tracking the South China Sea tropical depression, designating it 24W and Luis, respectively as it enters the PAR and about to make landfall on Taiwan.
- 22:00 UTC (06:00 TST, August 23) at 22.6°N 120.3°E – Tropical Depression 24W (Luis) makes landfall on Kaohsiung City as it moves eastward.

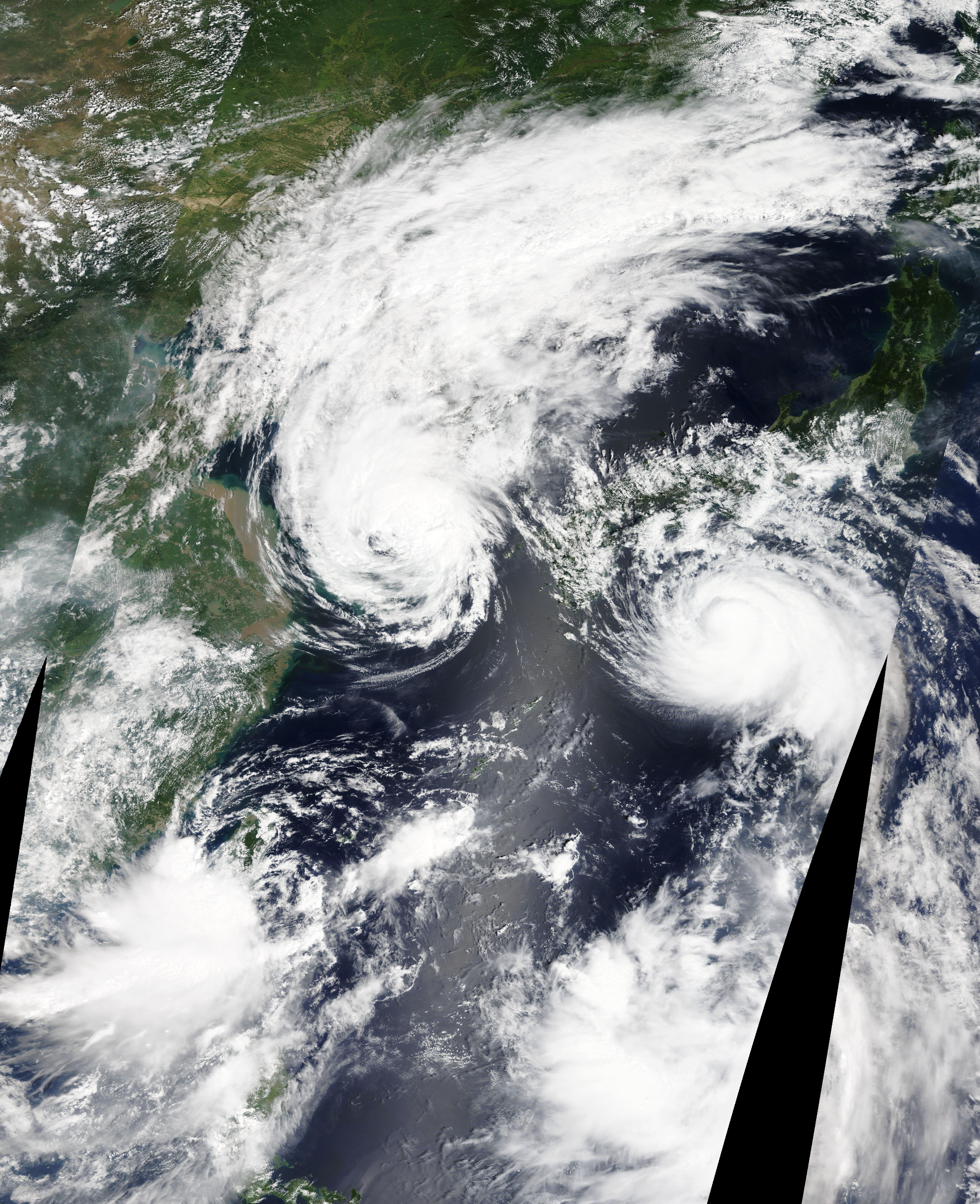
Three tropical cyclones endangering land: Soulik (top left) nearing on Korea, Cimaron (top right) closing in on Japan, and 24W/Luis (bottom left) over Taiwan and approaching China.

August 23

- 00:00 UTC
  - At 30.1°N 135.0°E – The JTWC further downgrades Cimaron to a Category 1-equivalent typhoon on the SSHWS.
  - At 22.3°N 119.7°E – The JMA estimates that 24W (Luis) has peaked in intensity with 10-minute winds of 30 knots (56 km/h; 35 mph) and a central pressure of 996 hPa (996.0 mbar; 29.41 inHg) as it turned northward.
  - At 22.8°N 120.5°E – The JTWC analyzes that 24W (Luis) has peaked in intensity with 1-minute winds of 30 knots (56 km/h; 35 mph) and a central pressure of 997 hPa (997.0 mbar; 29.44 inHg).
  - (08:00 PHT) at 22.8°N 120.4°E – The PAGASA assesses that 24W (Luis) has peaked in intensity with 10-minute winds of 30 knots (56 km/h; 35 mph) and a central pressure of 994 hPa (994.0 mbar; 29.35 inHg).
- 06:00 UTC at 33.6°N 125.5°E – The JTWC downgrades Soulik to a tropical storm as it turns northeast.
- 12:00 UTC
  - (21:00 JST) at 33.8°N 134.6°E – Typhoon Cimaron hits the southern portion of Tokushima Prefecture.
  - At 34.3°N 126.1°E – The JMA downgrades Soulik to a severe tropical storm as it is about to make landfall on South Korea.
- 14:00 UTC (23:00 KST) at 34.6°N 126.4°E – Soulik makes landfall on Haenam County, South Jeolla Province.
- 14:30 UTC (23:30 JST) at 34.8°N 134.7°E – Typhoon Cimaron makes another landfall on Himeji, Hyogo Prefecture.
- 15:00 UTC – 24W (Luis) emerges over Taiwan Strait.
- 18:00 UTC
  - At 35.7°N 127.3°E – The JMA downgrades Soulik to a tropical storm as it crosses the Korean Peninsula.
  - At 36.5°N 135.1°E – The JMA and JTWC downgrade Cimaron to a severe tropical storm and a tropical storm, respectively, as it emerges over the Sea of Japan.

August 24

- 06:00 UTC
  - At 40.7°N 137.4°E – The JMA downgrades Cimaron to a tropical storm as it completes its extratropical transition.
  - At 40.7°N 137.9°E – The JTWC assesses Cimaron has briefly deepened with a central pressure of 982 hPa (982.0 mbar; 29.00 inHg).
  - At 22.4°N 131.9°E – The JMA begins tracking a tropical depression in the Philippine Sea.
  - At 38.5°N 130.2°E – The JTWC assesses Soulik has briefly deepened with a central pressure of 979 hPa (979.0 mbar; 28.91 inHg) as it turns extratropical over the Sea of Japan.
- 12:00 UTC
  - At 40.1°N 131.7°E – The JTWC assesses that Soulik has completed its transition to an extratropical cyclone.
  - At 41.7°N 139.7°E – The JMA assesses that Cimaron has transitioned into an extratropical cyclone; the system would dissipate six hours later.
  - At 41.3°N 139.9°E – The JTWC assesses that Cimaron has transitioned into an extratropical cyclone.
- 13:00 UTC (21:00 PHT) – 24W (Luis) exits the PAR as it turns westward towards China.
- 18:00 UTC at 41.1°N 133.9°E – The JMA assesses that Soulik has transitioned into an extratropical cyclone over the Sea of Japan.

August 25

- 03:00 UTC (11:00 CST) at 25.9°N 118.3°E – 24W makes landfall on Fujian.
- 06:00 UTC at 25.0°N 118.0°E – The JTWC downgrades 24W to a tropical disturbance.
- 12:00 UTC at 28.8°N 124.7°E – The JMA estimates that the tropical depression formerly in the Philippine Sea and is now over the East China Sea has deepened with a central pressure of 1,000 hPa (1,000 mbar; 29.53 inHg) as it moves northwestward towards China.
- Between 18:00-00:00 UTC (02:00-08:00 CST, August 26) – The East China Sea tropical depression hits Shanghai.

August 26

- 06:00 UTC
  - At 24°N 117°E – The JMA stops tracking Ex-24W but not before slightly deepening to a central pressure of 998 hPa (998.0 mbar; 29.47 inHg) as it dissipates six hours later inland.
  - At 32.0°N 121.3°E – The JMA stops tracking the tropical depression over China as it dissipates.
- 18:00 UTC at 11.0°N 160.5°E – The JMA begins tracking a tropical depression near the Marshall Islands.

August 27

- 06:00 UTC at 13.5°N 159.1°E – The JTWC begins tracking the Marshall Islands tropical depression, designating it 25W.
- 12:00 UTC at 14.1°N 158.6°E – The JTWC assesses 25W has slightly deepened to a central pressure of 1,002 hPa (1,002 mbar; 29.59 inHg) as it moves northwestward.
- 18:00 UTC at 14.5°N 157.9°E – The JMA upgrades 25W to a tropical storm, assigning it the name Jebi.

August 28

- 00:00 UTC at 15.2°N 157.1°E – The JTWC further upgrades Jebi to a tropical storm.
- 18:00 UTC at 16.7°N 154.4°E – The JMA upgrades Jebi to a severe tropical storm as it turns to the west.

August 29

- 06:00 UTC
  - At 17.3°N 152.3°E – The JMA assesses Jebi has strengthened to a typhoon.
  - At 17.1°N 152.4°E – The JTWC upgrades Jebi to a Category 1 typhoon as it continues to intensify.
- 12:00 UTC at 17.3°N 151.3°E – As Jebi continues to rapidly intensify, the JTWC analyzes the system slightly deepened to a central pressure of 963 hPa (963.0 mbar; 28.44 inHg) before briefly rising.
- 18:00 UTC at 17.4°N 150.3°E – The JTWC further upgrades Jebi to a Category 2-equivalent typhoon as it nears the Northern Mariana Islands.

August 30

- 00:00 UTC at 17.6°N 149.2°E – Typhoon Jebi strengthens further to a Category 3-equivalent typhoon on the SSHWS.
- 06:00 UTC at 58.7°N 178.2°W – The extratropical remnants of then-Typhoon Soulik exit the West Pacific basin.
- 12:00 UTC at 17.8°N 146.8°E – The JTWC further upgrades Jebi to a Category 4 typhoon as it continues to traverse westwards.
- 18:00 UTC at 17.8°N 145.4°E – Typhoon Jebi further strengthens to a super typhoon and to a Category 5-equivalent typhoon after making its closest approach to the Marianas.

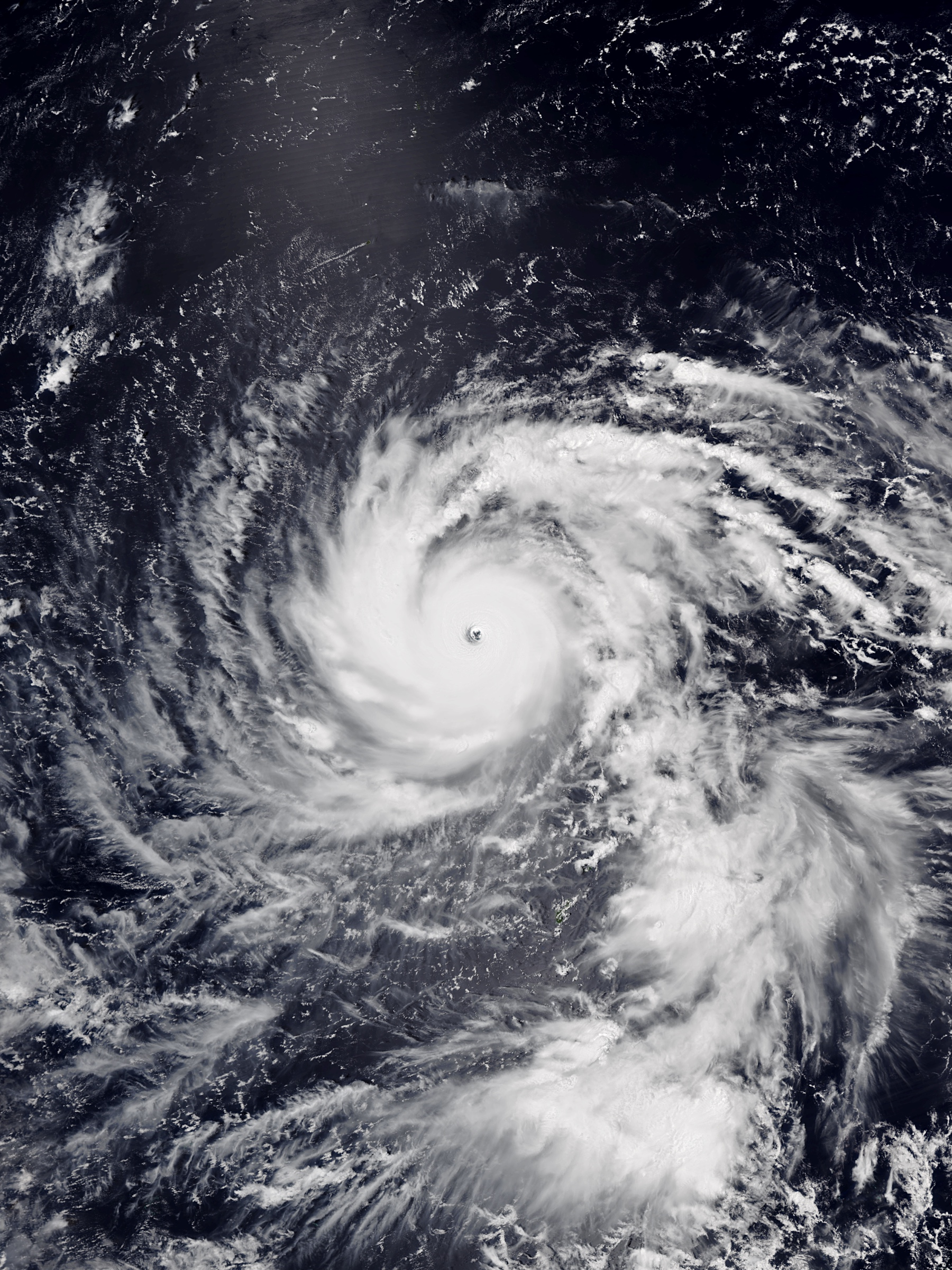
Jebi at its peak intensity after passing the Northern Mariana Islands on August 31.

August 31

- 00:00 UTC at 17.9°N 144.2°E – The JMA estimates that Typhoon Jebi has peaked in intensity with 10-minute winds of 105 knots (194 km/h; 121 mph) and a central pressure of 915 hPa (915.0 mbar; 27.02 inHg) as it continues its westward heading.
- 06:00 UTC at 18.2°N 142.7°E – The JTWC estimates that Super Typhoon Jebi has peaked in intensity with 1-minute sustained winds of 155 knots (287 km/h; 178 mph) and a central pressure of 907 hPa (907.0 mbar; 26.78 inHg).

=== September ===
September 1

- 12:00 UTC at 21.0°N 137.4°E – Super Typhoon Jebi weakens to a Category 4 typhoon per the JTWC as the system takes on a northwestward heading.
- 18:00 UTC at 21.7°N 136.5°E – The JTWC assesses Jebi has weakened below super typhoon status.

September 2

- 06:00 UTC
  - At 23.7°N 134.9°E – The JTWC assesses Jebi has slightly intensified, reaching a secondary peak with 1-minute winds of 125 knots (232 km/h; 144 mph) and a central pressure of 929 hPa (929.0 mbar; 27.43 inHg) .
  - (14:00 PHT) at 23.6°N 135.0°E – Typhoon Jebi enters the PAR, prompting the PAGASA to assign it the local name Maymay. The agency assesses the system with 10-minute winds of 95 knots (176 km/h; 109 mph) and a central pressure of 935 hPa (935.0 mbar; 27.61 inHg).
- 16:00 UTC (00:00 PHT, September 3) – The PAGASA declared Typhoon Jebi (Maymay) has exited the PAR.

September 3

- 00:00 UTC at 26.5°N 133.1°E – The JTWC downgrades Jebi to a Category 3-equivalent typhoon on the SSHWS as it recurves towards Japan.
- 18:00 UTC at 30.3°N 132.8°E – The JTWC assesses Jebi slightly deepened to a central pressure of 942 hPa (942.0 mbar; 27.82 inHg) before rising again as it turns northeast.

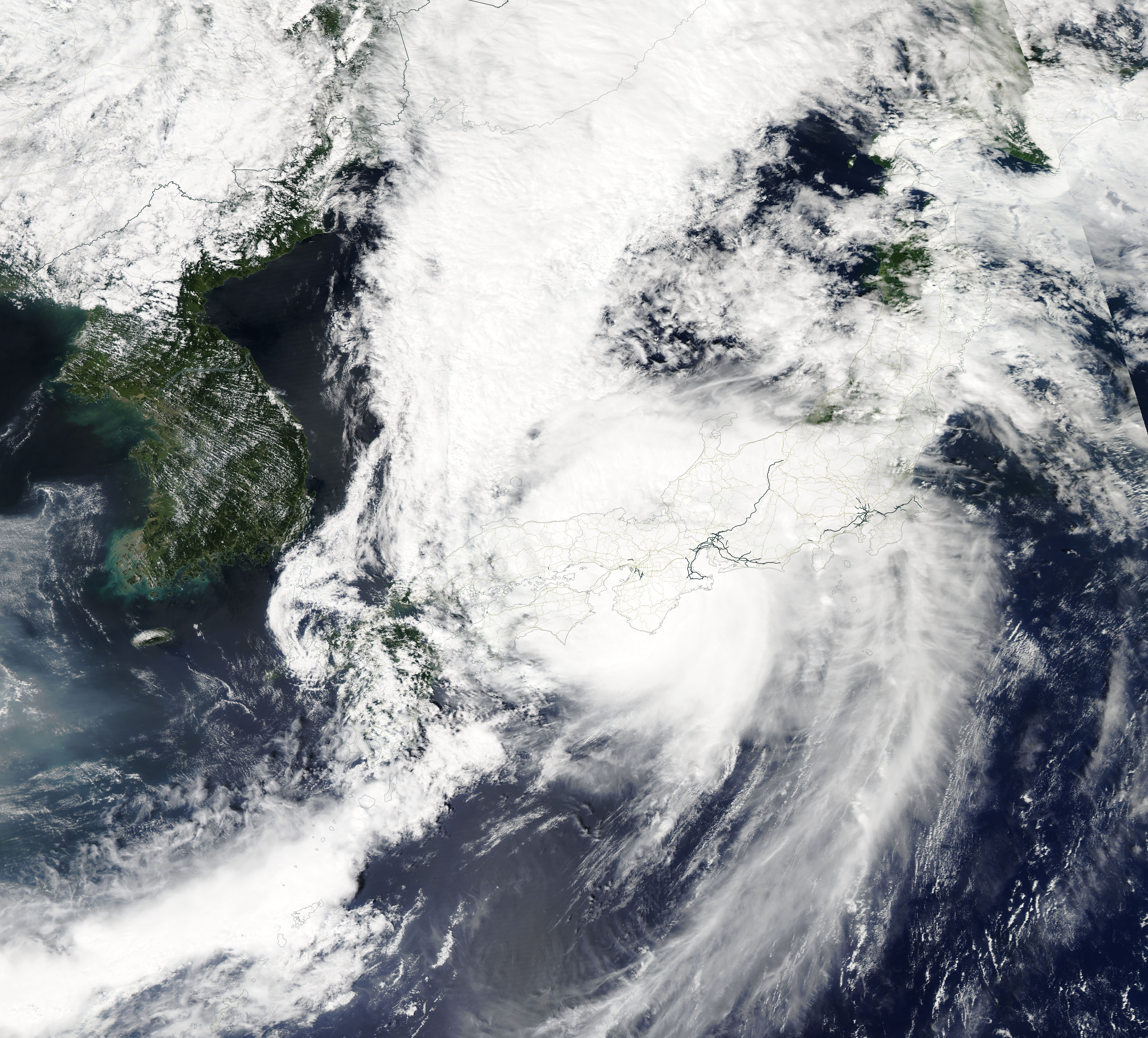
Jebi making landfall on Japan on September 4.

September 4

- 03:00 UTC (12:00 JST) at 33.8°N 134.5°E – Jebi makes its first landfall on southern Tokushima Prefecture.
- 05:00 UTC (14:00 JST) at 34.7°N 135.2°E – Jebi crosses Awaji Island and hits Kobe in Hyogo Prefecture.
- 06:00 UTC at 35.3°N 135.7°E – Typhoon Jebi rapidly weakens to a Category 1-equivalent typhoon as it is about to emerge over the Sea of Japan.
- 12:00 UTC at 39.2°N 137.6°E – The JTWC assesses that Jebi has transitioned into an extratropical cyclone.
- 15:00 UTC at 41.3°N 139.2°E – The JMA downgrades Jebi to a severe tropical storm.

September 5

- 00:00 UTC
  - At 46.5°N 139.0°E – The JMA assesses that Jebi has transitioned into an extratropical cyclone off the Primorsky Krai coast.
  - At 20.3°N 133.0°E – The JMA begins tracking a tropical depression in the Philippine Sea.
- 06:00 UTC at 20.6°N 132.0°E – The JMA assesses the tropical depression in the Philippine Sea slightly deepened to 1,004 hPa (1,004 mbar; 29.65 inHg).

September 6

- 00:00 UTC at 21.0°N 129.5°E – The JMA estimates that the Philippine Sea tropical depression has attained 10-minute maximum sustained winds of 30 knots (56 km/h; 35 mph) and re-deepened to a central pressure of 1,004 hPa (1,004 mbar; 29.65 inHg) as it turns more to the north.
- 12:00 UTC at 11.8°N 170.2°E – The JMA begins tracking another tropical depression near the Marshall Islands.

September 7

- 06:00 UTC
  - At 12.4°N 166.6°E – The JTWC begins tracking the Marshall Islands tropical depression, designating it 26W.
  - At 25.6°N 126.3°E – The JMA assesses the tropical depression formerly in the Philippine Sea and now over in the East China Sea re-attained a central pressure of 1,004 hPa (1,004 mbar; 29.65 inHg) as it is about to recurve.
  - At 62.1°N 136.3°E – The JMA last notes the extratropical remnants of Jebi as it crosses the 60th parallel north.
- 12:00 UTC
  - At 12.7°N 165.4°E – The JMA upgrades 26W to a tropical storm, assigning it the name Mangkhut.
  - At 12.8°N 165.3°E – The JTWC assesses Mangkhut deepened to a central pressure of 1,000 hPa (1,000 mbar; 29.53 inHg) before briefly rising.
- 18:00 UTC at 13.3°N 163.6°E – The JTWC upgrades Mangkhut to a tropical storm.

September 8

- 00:00 UTC at 29.6°N 128.4°E – The JMA stops tracking the East China Sea tropical depression as it dissipates six hours later.
- 06:00 UTC
  - At 20.5°N 121.8°E – The JMA begins tracking a tropical depression in the Luzon Strait with a central pressure of 1,006 hPa (1,006 mbar; 29.71 inHg).
  - (14:00 PHT) at 20.4°N 121.5°E – The PAGASA recognizes the Luzon Strait tropical depression, assigning it the local name Neneng. The agency assesses the system with 10-minute winds of 25 knots (46 km/h; 29 mph) and a central pressure of 1,006 hPa (1,006 mbar; 29.71 inHg), which would be its peak intensity inside the PAR.
- 18:00 UTC
  - At 14.6°N 157.4°E – The JMA upgrades Mangkhut to a severe tropical storm as it continues on a westward track.
  - At 21.1°N 122.5°E – The JMA assesses Neneng re-attained a central pressure of 1,006 hPa (1,006 mbar; 29.71 inHg) as it moves to the northeast.
  - (02:00 PHT, September 9) at 21.0°N 122.6°E – The PAGASA assesses Neneng re-attained a central pressure of 1,006 hPa (1,006 mbar; 29.71 inHg) after making a close approach on Batanes Islands.

September 9

- 00:00 UTC
  - At 14.8°N 155.2°E – The JMA further upgrades Mangkhut to a typhoon.
  - At 15.2°N 154.8°E – The JTWC assesses Mangkhut has strengthened to a Category 1 typhoon.
- 12:00 UTC at 22.0°N 123.1°E – The JTWC begins tracking Tropical Depression Neneng, designating it 27W as it sharply turns to the west.
- 18:00 UTC (02:00 PHT, September 10) at 21.7°N 122.2°E – The PAGASA assesses 27W (Neneng) re-attained a central pressure of 1,006 hPa (1,006 mbar; 29.71 inHg).

September 10

- 00:00 UTC at 14.5°N 147.4°E – The JTWC upgrades Mangkhut to a Category 2-equivalent typhoon on the SSHWS as it approaches the Northern Mariana Islands.
- 06:00 UTC at 21.5°N 121.4°E – The JTWC upgrades 27W (Neneng) to a tropical storm as it passes south of Taiwan.
- 12:00 UTC at 14.1°N 144.2°E – Typhoon Mangkhut intensifies to a Category 3 typhoon after making a close approach to the Marianas.
- 14:00 UTC (22:00 PHT) – The PAGASA states 27W (Neneng) has exited the PAR as it accelerates westward.

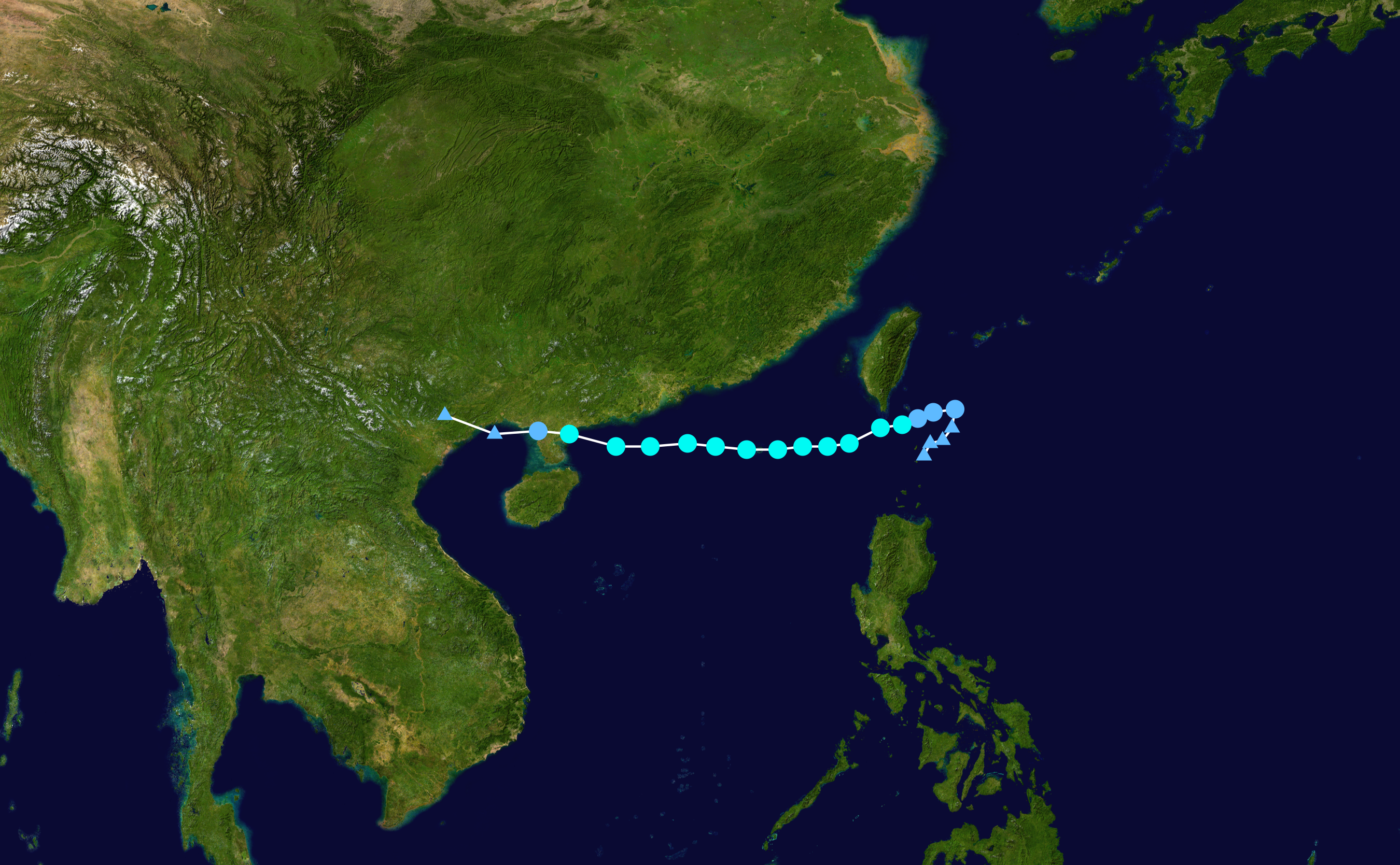
Track of Barijat during mid-September.

September 11

- 00:00 UTC
  - At 20.9°N 118.7°E – The JMA upgrades 27W to a tropical storm, assigning it the name Barijat as it moves generally westward over the South China Sea.
  - At 13.9°N 141.2°E – The JTWC further upgrades Mangkhut to a Category 4 typhoon as it rapidly intensifies while moving westward.
- 06:00 UTC
  - At 20.7°N 118.0°E – The JMA estimates that Barijat has peaked in intensity with 10-minute winds of 40 knots (74 km/h; 46 mph) and a central pressure of 998 hPa (998.0 mbar; 29.47 inHg).
  - At 20.8°N 118.2°E – The JTWC estimates that Barijat has peaked in intensity with maximum 1-minute sustained winds of 45 knots (83 km/h; 52 mph) and a central pressure of 996 hPa (996.0 mbar; 29.41 inHg).
  - At 13.9°N 139.8°E – Typhoon Mangkhut intensifies further to a super typhoon and to a Category 5-equivalent typhoon on the SSHWS.
- 12:00 UTC at 13.7°N 138.7°E – The JMA estimates that Mangkhut has peaked in intensity with 10-minute sustained winds of 110 knots (200 km/h; 130 mph) and a central pressure of 905 hPa (905.0 mbar; 26.72 inHg).

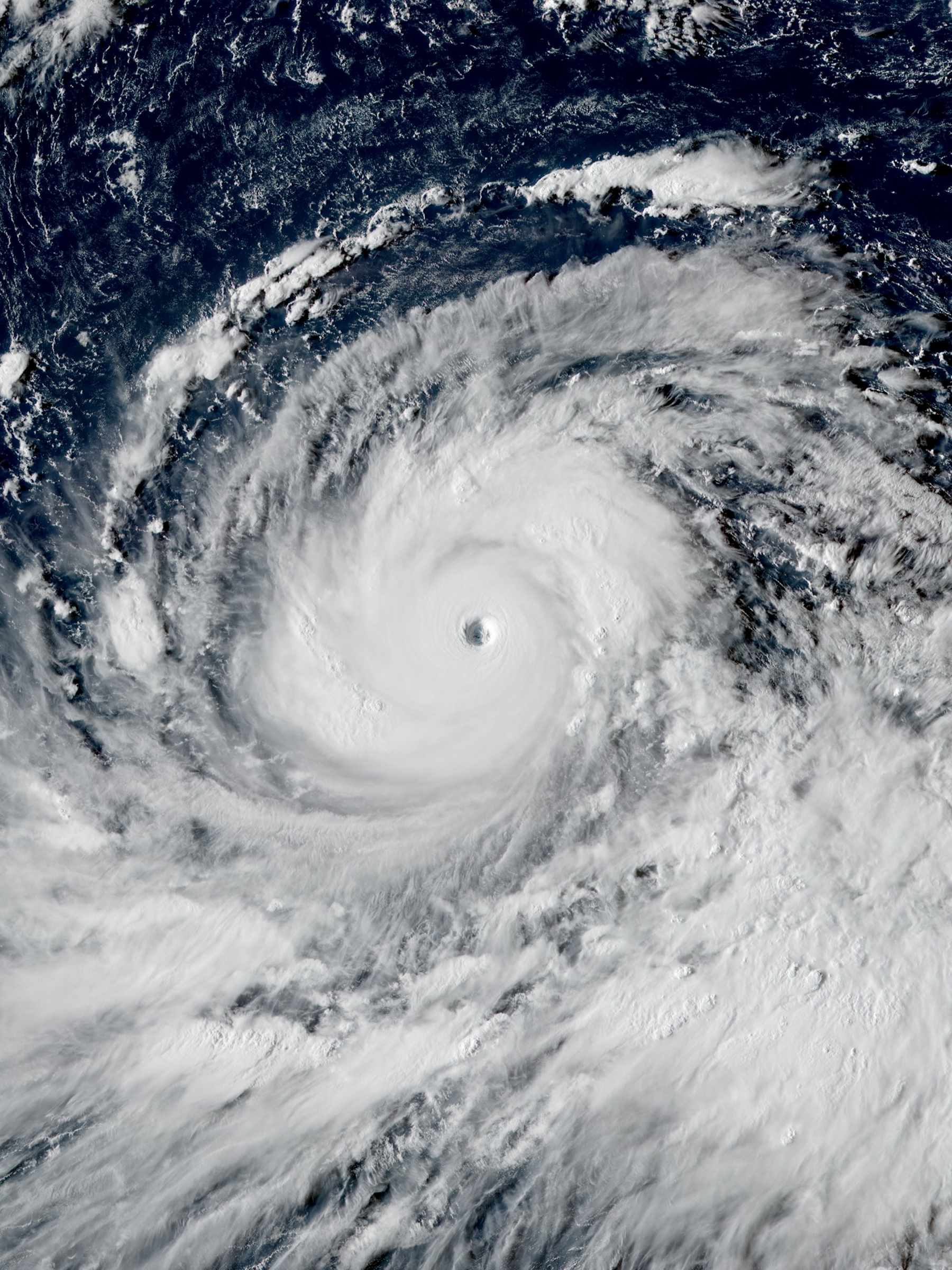
Mangkhut shortly after its peak intensity on September 12.

September 12

- 06:00 UTC at 14.0°N 135.2°E – The JTWC estimates that Mangkhut has peaked in intensity with 1-minute sustained winds of 155 knots (287 km/h; 178 mph) and a central pressure of 896 hPa (896.0 mbar; 26.46 inHg) as it is about to enter the PAR.
- 07:00 UTC (15:00 PHT) – Super Typhoon Mangkhut enters the PAR, prompting the PAGASA to assign it the local name Ompong. Upon entering, PAGASA assesses the system is at its peak with 10-minute winds of 110 knots (200 km/h; 130 mph) and a central pressure of 905 hPa (905.0 mbar; 26.72 inHg).
- 18:00 UTC at 20.8°N 112.2°E – The JTWC assesses Barijat has achieved a secondary peak, re-attaining 1-minute sustained winds of 45 knots (83 km/h; 52 mph) but with a slightly higher central pressure of 997 hPa (997.0 mbar; 29.44 inHg) as it nears southern China.

September 13

- 00:30 UTC (08:30 CST) at 21.3°N 110.4°E – Tropical Storm Barijat makes landfall on Zhanjiang, Guangdong.
- 06:00 UTC
  - At 22.0°N 109.9°E – The JMA downgrades Barijat to a tropical depression and stops tracking it as it dissipates six hours later.
  - At 21.3°N 109.7°E – The JTWC downgrades Barijat to a tropical depression as it moved near the coast.
- 12:00 UTC at 21.2°N 108.3°E – The JTWC downgrades Barijat to a tropical disturbance as it emerges over the Gulf of Tonkin.
- 18:00 UTC at 15.3°N 127.9°E – After briefly weakening, the JTWC estimates that Mangkhut (Ompong) has attained a secondary peak, re-attaining 1-minute sustained winds of 155 knots (287 km/h; 178 mph) but slightly higher central pressure of 897 hPa (897.0 mbar; 26.49 inHg) as it turns northwest towards northern Luzon.

Mangkhut making landfall on Luzon on September 14.

September 14

- 18:00 UTC (02:00 PHT, September 15) at 17.9°N 122.2°E – Turning westward, Super Typhoon Mangkhut (Ompong) makes its first landfall on Baggao, Cagayan.

September 15

- 00:00 UTC
  - At 18.2°N 120.9°E – The JTWC downgrades Mangkhut (Ompong) back to a Category 4 typhoon as it crosses Luzon.
  - (08:00 PHT) at 18.1°N 120.8°E – The PAGASA also downgrades Mangkhut (Ompong) to a typhoon.
- 06:00 UTC at 18.6°N 119.6°E – The JTWC further downgrades Mangkhut (Ompong) to a Category 3-equivalent typhoon after emerging over the South China Sea.
- 12:00 UTC
  - At 19.2°N 118.2°E – The JTWC further downgrades Mangkhut (Ompong) to a Category 2-equivalent typhoon on the SSHWS as it moves northwestward.
  - (20:00 PHT) at 19.2°N 118.3°E – The PAGASA announces Mangkhut (Ompong) has exited the PAR.

September 16

- 00:00 UTC at 20.8°N 115.3°E – Typhoon Mangkhut further weakens to a Category 1 typhoon as it moves towards China.
- 09:00 UTC (17:00 CST) at 22.3°N 112.8°E – Typhoon Mangkhut makes its second and final landfall on Taishan, Jiangmen, Guangdong.
- 18:00 UTC
  - At 22.7°N 109.7°E – The JMA downgrades Mangkhut to a severe tropical storm as it moves further inland.
  - At 22.4°N 109.9°E – The JTWC follows suit, downgrading Mangkhut to a tropical storm.

September 17

- 00:00 UTC at 23.2°N 108.3°E – The JMA further downgrades Mangkhut to a tropical storm.
- 06:00 UTC
  - At 24.0°N 107.0°E – The JMA downgrades Mangkhut to a tropical depression as it continues to deteriorate inland.
  - At 23.4°N 106.9°E – The JTWC downgrades Mangkhut to a tropical depression as it moves west-northwest.
- 12:00 UTC at 23.7°N 105.3°E – Mangkhut weakens further to a tropical disturbance, per the JTWC.
- 18:00 UTC at 24.1°N 103.9°E – The JMA last notes Tropical Depression Mangkhut; it dissipates over Southern China early the next day.

September 20

- 06:00 UTC at 11.8°N 146.7°E – The JMA begins tracking a tropical depression southeast of Guam with a central pressure of 1,002 hPa (1,002 mbar; 29.59 inHg) .
- 18:00 UTC at 13.8°N 145.1°E – The JTWC begins monitoring the tropical depression near Guam, designating it 28W.

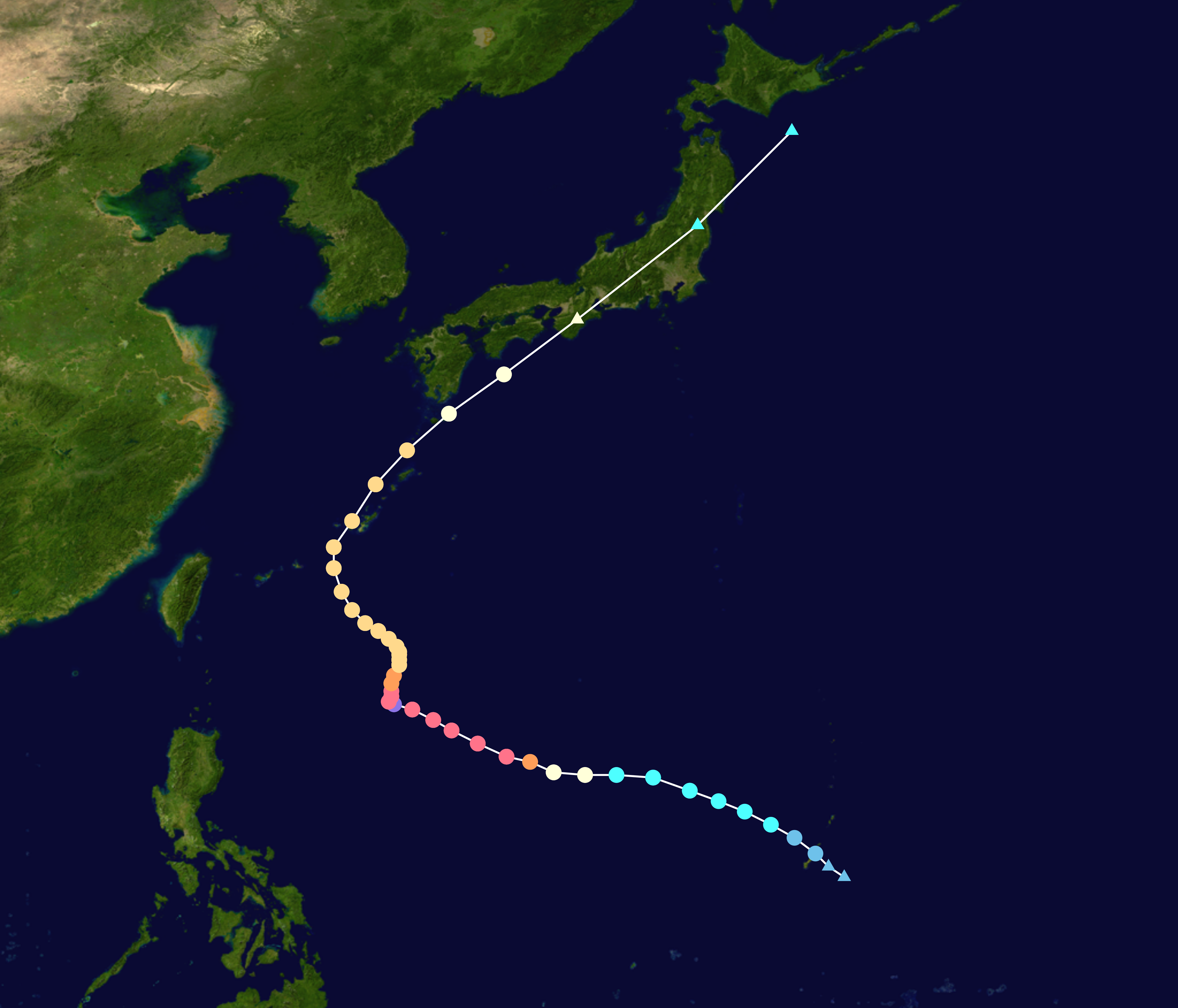
Track of Trami during mid-late September.

September 21

- 06:00 UTC
  - At 15.0°N 143.7°E – After passing north of Guam, the JMA upgrades 28W to a tropical storm, assigning it the name Trami.
  - At 14.9°N 143.4°E – The JTWC upgrades Trami to a tropical storm as it moves northwestwards.
- 12:00 UTC at 19.5°N 176.3°E – The JMA begins tracking a tropical depression that formed from the remnants of Hurricane Olivia near the International Date Line.
- 18:00 UTC at 19.0°N 175.5°E – The JMA assesses the tropical depression near the IDL slightly deepened to 1,006 hPa (1,006 mbar; 29.71 inHg) as it continues its westward track.

September 22

- 00:00 UTC at 15.9°N 140.2°E – The JMA upgrades Trami to a severe tropical storm as it continues to move over the Philippine Sea.
- 18:00 UTC
  - At 17.1°N 136.2°E – The JMA further upgrades Trami to a typhoon as it moves westward.
  - At 16.8°N 136.3°E – The JTWC upgrades Trami to a Category 1 typhoon.

September 23

- 00:00 UTC – The JMA stops tracking the International Date Line tropical depression as it dissipates six hours later.
- 01:00 UTC (09:00 PHT) – Typhoon Trami enters the PAR, prompting the PAGASA to assign it the local name Paeng.
- 06:00 UTC at 17.3°N 134.2°E – Typhoon Trami (Paeng) rapidly intensifies to a Category 3-equivalent typhoon on the SSHWS.
- 12:00 UTC at 17.5°N 133.3°E – Typhoon Trami (Paeng) becomes a Category 4-equivalent typhoon as it turns to the northwest.

September 24

- 06:00 UTC
  - At 18.9°N 130.5°E – The JTWC further upgrades Trami (Paeng) to a super typhoon.
  - (14:00 PHT) at 18.9°N 130.4°E – The PAGASA follows suit, upgrading Trami (Paeng) to a super typhoon.
- 18:00 UTC
  - At 19.6°N 129.1°E – The JMA estimates that Trami (Paeng) has peaked in intensity with 10-minute winds of 105 knots (194 km/h; 121 mph) and a central pressure of 915 hPa (915.0 mbar; 27.02 inHg) as it slows down.
  - At 19.5°N 129.0°E – The JTWC upgrades Trami (Paeng) to a Category 5-equivalent typhoon on the SSHWS, peaking with maximum 1-minute sustained winds of 140 knots (260 km/h; 160 mph) and a central pressure of 914 hPa (914.0 mbar; 26.99 inHg).
  - (02:00 PHT, September 25) at 19.5°N 129.1°E – The PAGASA assesses Trami (Paeng) to have peaked with 10-minute winds of 105 knots (194 km/h; 121 mph) and a central pressure of 915 hPa (915.0 mbar; 27.02 inHg).

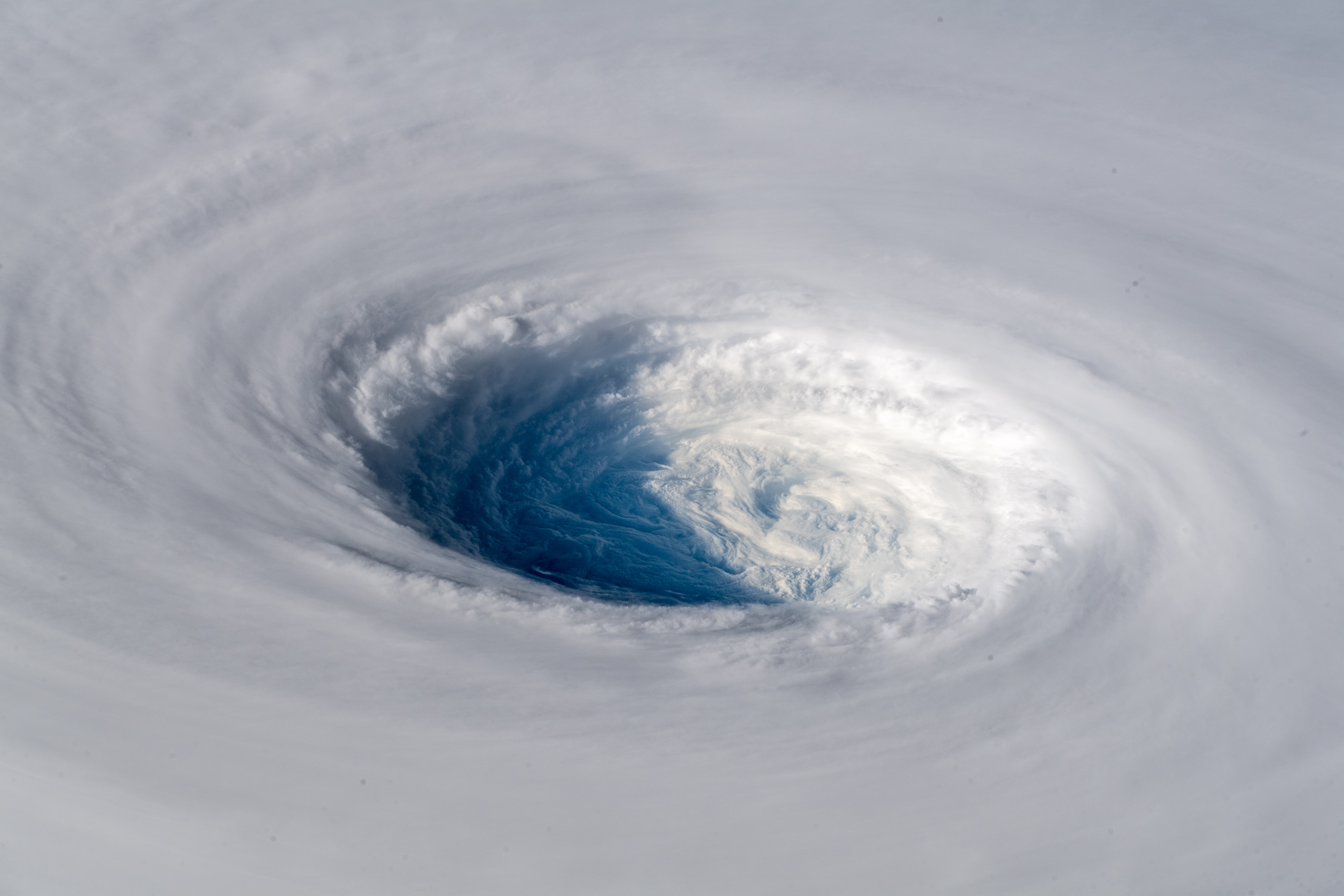
Eye of Typhoon Trami as seen from space.

September 25

- 00:00 UTC at 19.6°N 128.8°E – The JTWC downgrades Trami (Paeng) to a Category 4 super typhoon as it slowly turns to the northeast.
- 06:00 UTC at 23.8°N 155.0°E – The JMA begins tracking a tropical depression southeast of Japan with a central pressure of 1,008 hPa (1,008 mbar; 29.77 inHg), presumably coming from the remnants of the IDL tropical depression previously monitored a few days ago.
- 12:00 UTC at 20.0°N 128.9°E – The JTWC assesses Trami (Paeng) has weakened below super typhoon intensity as it slowly moves northward.
- 18:00 UTC (02:00 PHT, September 26) at 20.3°N 128.9°E – The JTWC further downgrades Trami (Paeng) to a Category 3 typhoon while the PAGASA downgrades it to a typhoon.

September 26

- 00:00 UTC
  - At 20.6°N 129.0°E – The JTWC assesses Trami (Paeng) has slightly deepened to a central pressure of 942 hPa (942.0 mbar; 27.82 inHg).
  - At 27.8°N 152.3°E – The JMA estimates that the tropical depression southeast of Japan has attained 10-minute winds of 30 knots (56 km/h; 35 mph).
  - At 27.5°N 151.7°E – The JTWC begins tracking the tropical depression southeast of Japan, designating it 29W as it moves northwards.
- 06:00 UTC at 21.0°N 129.2°E – The JTWC further downgrades Trami (Paeng) to a Category 2 typhoon as it continues to move slowly northwards.
- 12:00 UTC at 30.2°N 151.2°E – The JTWC assesses 29W has attained its maximum 1-minute winds of 30 knots (56 km/h; 35 mph) as it turns to the north-northeast.
- 18:00 UTC
  - At 21.4°N 129.2°E – Typhoon Trami (Paeng) has slightly deepened to a central pressure of 953 hPa (953.0 mbar; 28.14 inHg), per the JTWC as it now slowly turns to the northwest.
  - At 31.9°N 151.4°E – The JTWC assesses 29W has attained its lowest central pressure of 1,001 hPa (1,001 mbar; 29.56 inHg).

September 27

- 12:00 UTC
  - At 36.3°N 153.9°E – The JTWC assesses that 29W has transitioned into an extratropical cyclone.
  - At 22.0°N 128.8°E – Brought upon by pressure fluctuations, Typhoon Trami (Paeng)'s central pressure slightly dropped to 951 hPa (951.0 mbar; 28.08 inHg), per the JTWC.
- 18:00 UTC at 37.8°N 155.9°E – The JMA assesses Ex-29W has turned extratropical as it moves northeastward.

September 28

- 00:00 UTC
  - At 7.4°N 150.9°E – The JMA begins tracking a tropical depression west of Chuuk Lagoon.
  - At 7.4°N 151.1°E – The JTWC begins tracking the tropical depression west of Chuuk, designating it 30W.
  - At 22.6°N 127.9°E – The JTWC assesses Trami (Paeng) has slightly intensified with 1-minute winds of 95 knots (176 km/h; 109 mph).
- 06:00 UTC at 23.1°N 127.4°E – The JTWC assesses Trami (Paeng) has also slightly deepened with a central pressure of 949 hPa (949.0 mbar; 28.02 inHg) as it approaches the Ryukyus.
- 12:00 UTC at 9.7°N 148.0°E – The JTWC upgrades 30W to a tropical storm as it moves northwestward, approaching Guam.
- 18:00 UTC at 11.0°N 146.5°E – The JMA assesses 30W deepened to a central pressure of 1,002 hPa (1,002 mbar; 29.59 inHg) before slightly rising.
- 22:00 UTC (06:00 PHT, September 29) – The PAGASA announces Trami (Paeng) has exited the PAR.

September 29

- Between 03:00-01:00 UTC, September 30 (12:00-10:00 JST, September 30) – Typhoon Trami hits the Ryukyu Islands, particularly crossing over Kerama Islands, Tokara Islands, and the northeastern group of Ōsumi Islands.
- 06:00 UTC
  - At 12.6°N 142.6°E – After making its close approach to Guam, the JMA upgrades 30W to a tropical storm, assigning it the name Kong-rey.
  - At 26.5°N 127.4°E – The JTWC assesses Trami's central pressure slightly dropped to 952 hPa (952.0 mbar; 28.11 inHg) as it moves northeastward, paralleling the Ryukyus.
- 18:00 UTC
  - At 13.1°N 139.9°E – The JMA further upgrades Kong-rey to a severe tropical storm.
  - At 13.3°N 139.6°E – The JTWC assesses Kong-rey has intensified to a Category 1 typhoon.

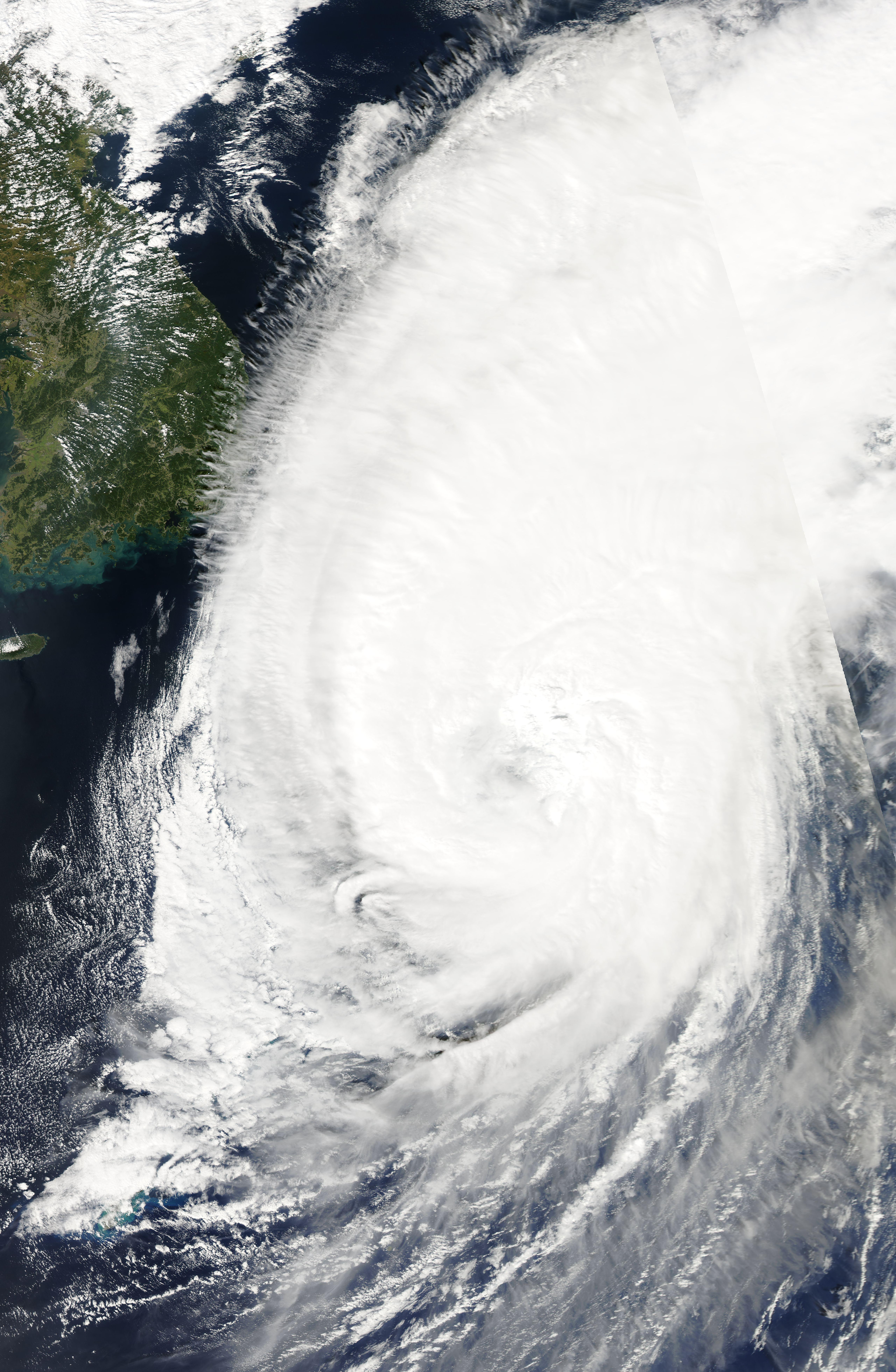
Trami making landfall on Japan on September 30.

September 30

- 00:00 UTC at 30.6°N 131.1°E – After maintaining Category 2 status for several days, the JTWC finally downgrades Trami to a Category 1-equivalent typhoon.
- 06:00 UTC at 14.5°N 138.1°E – The JMA upgrades Kong-rey to a typhoon as it moves northwestward.
- 11:00 UTC (20:00 JST) at 33.8°N 135.5°E – Trami makes landfall on Tanabe, Wakayama Prefecture.
- 12:00 UTC at 34.2°N 136.0°E – Accelerating to the northeast, the JTWC assesses that Trami has transitioned into a typhoon-force extratropical cyclone.
- 12:00 UTC at 15.0°N 137.2°E – The JTWC further upgrades Kong-rey to a Category 2-equivalent typhoon on the SSHWS.

=== October ===
October 1

- 00:00 UTC
  - At 41.3°N 144.2°E – The JMA assesses that Trami has transitioned into an extratropical cyclone east of Hokkaido.
  - At 15.6°N 135.9°E – Typhoon Kong-rey becomes a Category 3-equivalent typhoon on the SSHWS.
- 06:00 UTC at 16.1°N 135.2°E – The JTWC further upgrades Kong-rey to a Category 4 typhoon as it is about to enter the PAR.
- 08:00 UTC (16:00 PHT) – Kong-rey enters the PAR as a super typhoon, prompting the PAGASA to assign it the local name Queenie.
- 12:00 UTC at 16.8°N 134.4°E – The JMA estimates that Kong-rey (Queenie) has peaked in intensity with 10-minute winds of 115 knots (213 km/h; 132 mph) and a central pressure of 900 hPa (900.0 mbar; 26.58 inHg) while the JTWC further upgrades the system to a super typhoon.
- 18:00 UTC (02:00 PHT, October 2) at 17.3°N 133.6°E – Super Typhoon Kong-rey (Queenie) further intensifies to a Category 5-equivalent typhoon on the SSHWS, peaking with 1-minute winds of 150 knots (280 km/h; 170 mph) and a central pressure of 906 hPa (906.0 mbar; 26.75 inHg). The PAGASA also assesses that the system has peaked with 10-minute winds of 115 knots (213 km/h; 132 mph) and a central pressure of 900 hPa (900.0 mbar; 26.58 inHg) as it continues to move northwest.

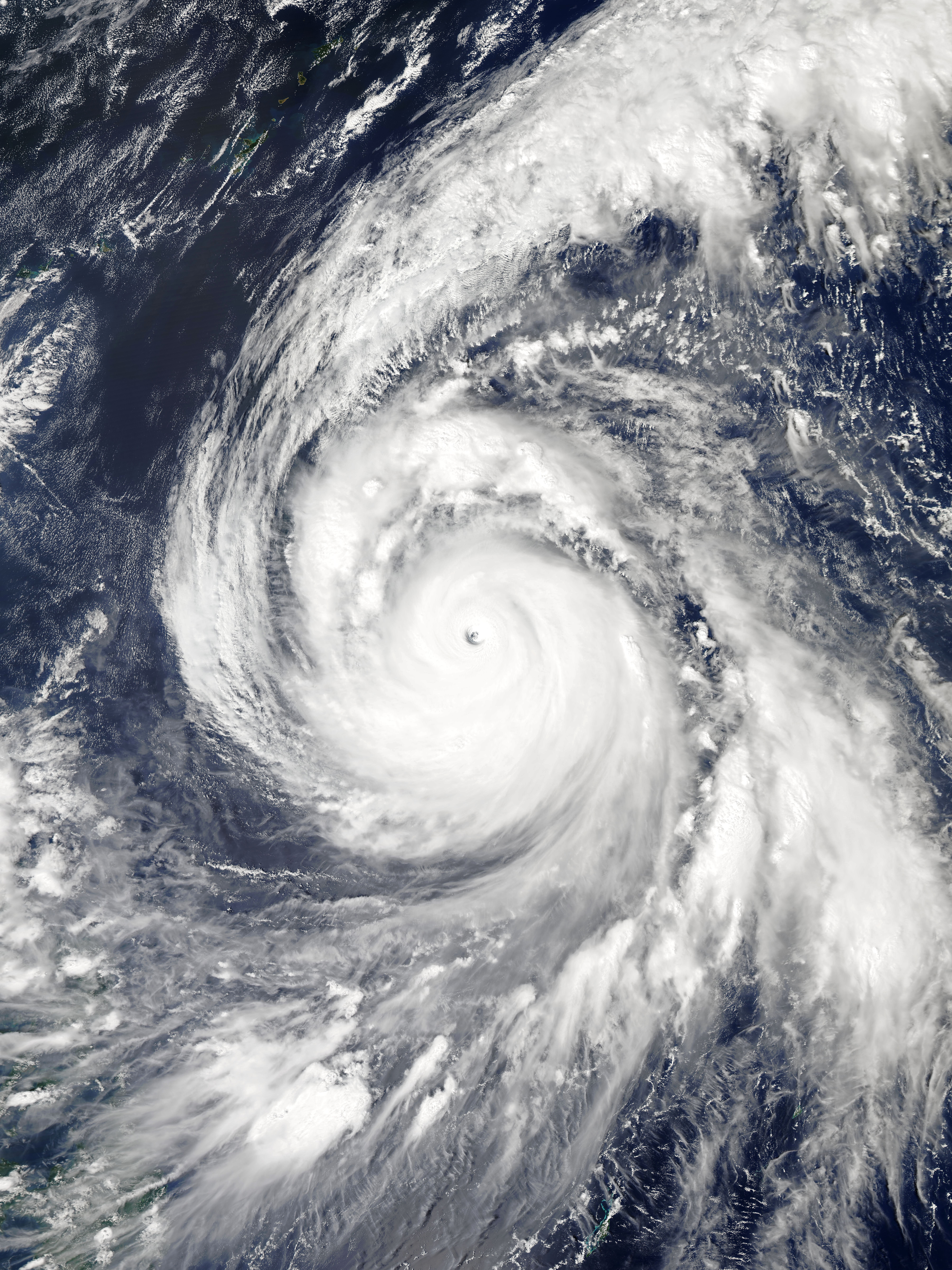
Kong-rey over the Philippine Sea on October 2.

October 2

- 12:00 UTC at 18.9°N 131.2°E – The JTWC assesses Kong-rey has weakened to a Category 4 super typhoon.
- 18:00 UTC
  - At 19.6°N 130.3°E – Kong-rey (Queenie) falls below super typhoon status as it continues to move over the Philippine Sea.
  - (02:00 PHT, October 3) at 19.5°N 130.4°E – The PAGASA also assesses Kong-rey (Queenie) has weakened to a typhoon.

October 3

- 00:00 UTC at 20.1°N 129.7°E – Typhoon Kong-rey (Queenie) further weakens to a Category 3-equivalent typhoon.
- 06:00 UTC at 20.8°N 129.2°E – The JTWC further downgrades Kong-rey (Queenie) to a Category 2 typhoon.
- 18:00 UTC
  - At 55.3°N 175.2°W – The JMA last notes the extratropical remnants of Trami after exiting the West Pacific basin.
  - At 22.4°N 128.1°E – The JTWC downgrades Kong-rey (Queenie) to a Category 1 typhoon as it nears the Ryukyu Islands.

October 4

- 06:00 UTC
  - At 24.3°N 127.1°E – The JMA assesses Kong-rey (Queenie) has weakened to a severe tropical storm.
  - At 24.4°N 127.1°E – The JTWC assesses Kong-rey (Queenie) slightly deepened to a central pressure of 973 hPa (973.0 mbar; 28.73 inHg).
- 10:00 UTC (18:00 PHT) – The PAGASA announces Kong-rey (Queenie) has exited the PAR as the system enters the East China Sea.

October 5

- 00:00 UTC at 27.9°N 125.7°E – The JTWC further downgrades Kong-rey to a high-end tropical storm as it turns northward.
- 06:00 UTC at 29.5°N 125.9°E – The JMA assesses Kong-rey has re-strengthened to a typhoon, attaining a secondary peak with 10-minute winds of 65 knots (120 km/h; 75 mph) and a maintained central pressure of 975 hPa (975.0 mbar; 28.79 inHg).
- 12:00 UTC at 31.4°N 125.8°E – The JTWC follows suit, re-upgrading Kong-rey to a Category 1 typhoon with 1-minute winds of 65 knots (120 km/h; 75 mph) and a central pressure of 975 hPa (975.0 mbar; 28.79 inHg) as it turns to the northeast.

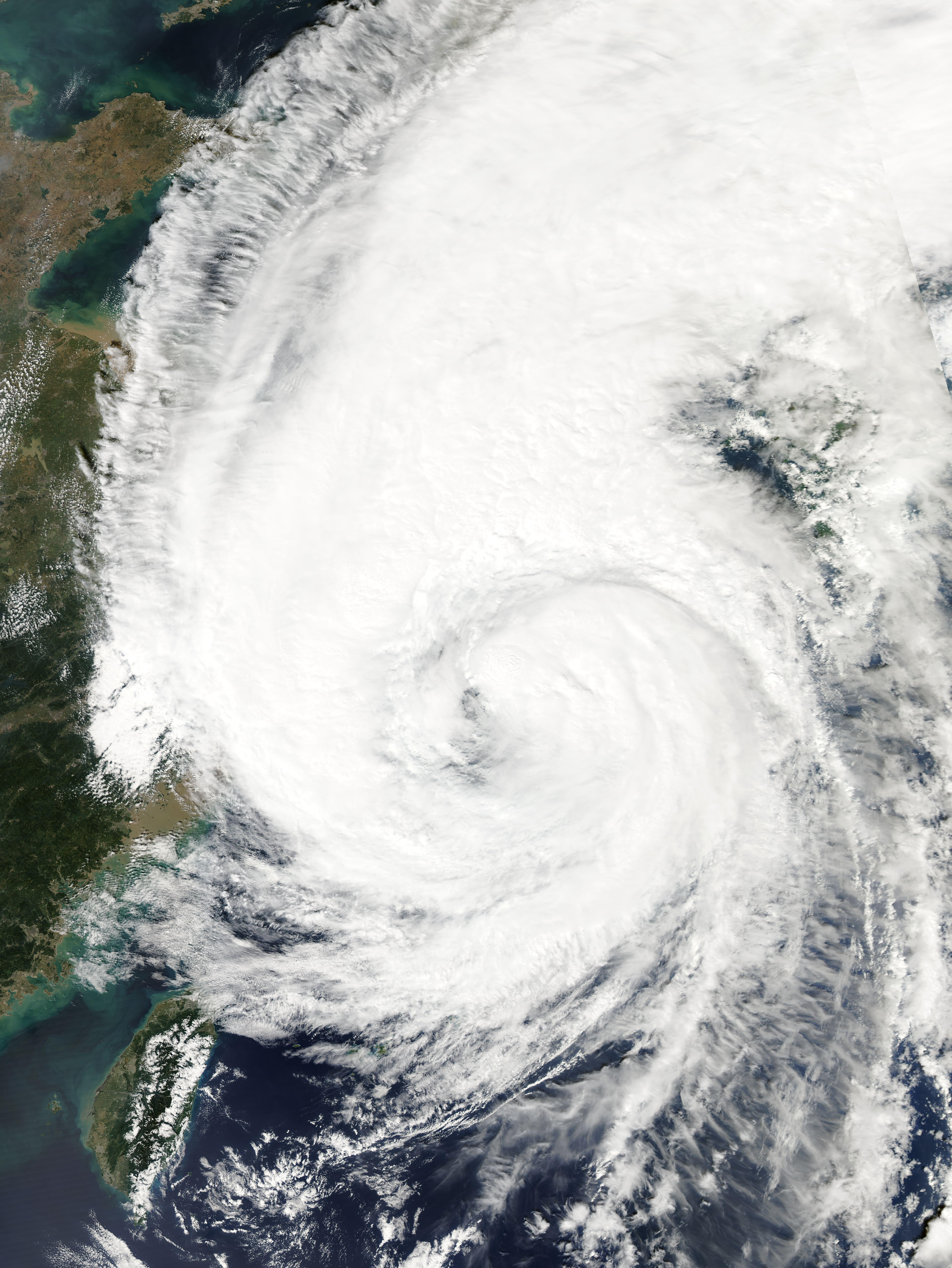
Kong-rey about to make landfall on Korea on October 5.

October 6

- 00:00 UTC
  - At 34.7°N 128.1°E – The JMA downgrades Kong-rey to a severe tropical storm as it is about to make landfall on South Korea.
  - At 35.0°N 128.6°E – The JTWC downgrades Kong-rey back to a tropical storm.
- 00:50 UTC (09:50 KST) at 34.8°N 128.4°E – Kong-rey makes landfall on Tongyeong, South Gyeongsang Province.
- 12:00 UTC
  - At 38.9°N 133.7°E – The JMA assesses that Kong-rey has transitioned into an extratropical cyclone over the Sea of Japan.
  - At 38.7°N 133.4°E – The JTWC assesses that Kong-rey has turned extratropical as it moves towards Hokkaido.

October 7

- 12:00 UTC at 41.2°N 152.0°E – The JMA last notes the extratropical remnants of Kong-rey after crossing the Oshima Peninsula and emerging back over the Pacific Ocean; the system dissipates six hours later

October 19

- 00:00 UTC at 8.7°N 109.1°E – The JMA begins tracking a tropical depression in the South China Sea south of Vietnam with a central pressure of 1,008 hPa (1,008 mbar; 29.77 inHg).

October 20

- 06:00 UTC at 10.9°N 102.2°E – The JMA stops tracking the South China Sea tropical depression as it enters the Gulf of Thailand.
- 18:00 UTC at 8.4°N 160.7°E – The JMA begins tracking a tropical depression near the Marshall Islands.

October 21

- 06:00 UTC at 8.6°N 158.9°E – The JMA assesses the tropical depression near the Marshall Islands deepened to a central pressure of 1,004 hPa (1,004 mbar; 29.65 inHg) before rising slightly.
- 12:00 UTC at 8.4°N 157.6°E – The JTWC begins tracking the Marshall Islands tropical depression, designating it 31W as it moves west-northwestward.

October 22

- 00:00 UTC
  - At 9.4°N 156.1°E – The JMA upgrades 31W to a tropical storm, assigning it the name Yutu.
  - At 9.3°N 155.6°E – The JTWC upgrades Yutu to a tropical storm as it turns to the northwest.
- 18:00 UTC at 11.3°N 152.8°E – The JMA further upgrades Yutu to a severe tropical storm as it starts to intensify rapidly.

October 23

- 00:00 UTC
  - At 11.6°N 151.8°E – The JMA upgrades Yutu to a typhoon.
  - At 11.4°N 151.6°E – The JTWC upgrades Yutu to a Category 1 typhoon.
- 12:00 UTC at 12.0°N 149.6°E – Typhoon Yutu strengthens further to a Category 2 typhoon as it turns northwestward towards the Marianas.
- 18:00 UTC at 12.7°N 148.9°E – Typhoon Yutu becomes a Category 3 typhoon as it continues its rapid intensification.

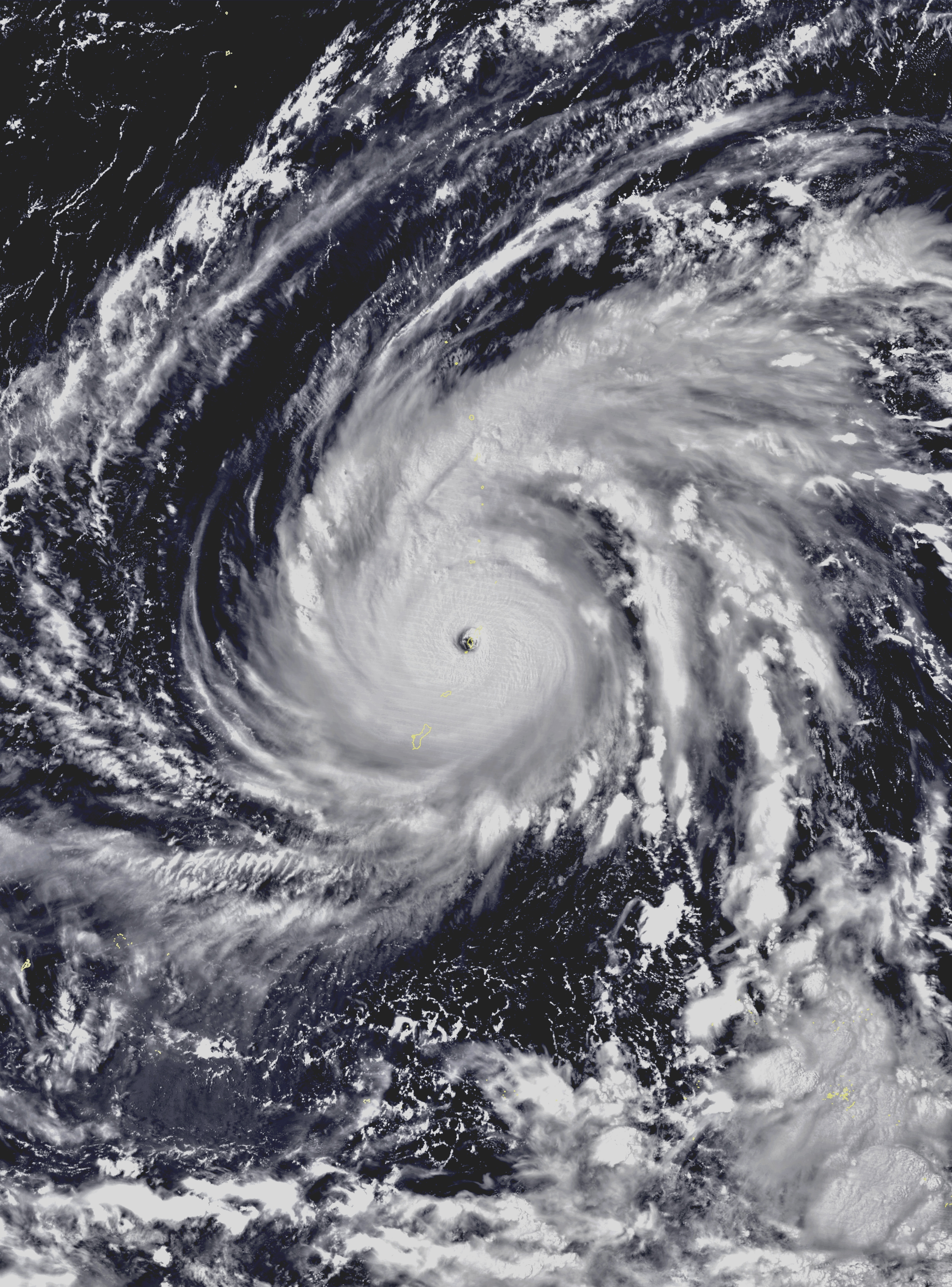
Yutu making landfall on Tinian and Saipan at its peak intensity on October 24.

October 24

- 00:00 UTC at 13.3°N 148.0°E – The JTWC further upgrades Yutu to a Category 4 super typhoon as it closes in on the Marianas.
- 06:00 UTC at 13.9°N 147.1°E – Super Typhoon Yutu strengthens further to a Category 5 typhoon.
- 12:00 UTC
  - At 14.7°N 146.2°E – The JMA estimates that Yutu has peaked in intensity with 10-minute winds of 115 knots (213 km/h; 132 mph) and a central pressure of 900 hPa (900.0 mbar; 26.58 inHg) as it is about to directly hit the islands of Saipan and Tinian.
  - At 14.6°N 146.2°E – The JTWC analyzes that Yutu has attained its highest 1-minute winds of 150 knots (280 km/h; 170 mph) as it is about to make landfall.
- Between 14:00-18:00 UTC (00:00-04:00 ChST, October 25) – Yutu hits the southern portion of Saipan and crosses Tinian.
- 18:00 UTC at 15.3°N 145.2°E – The JTWC estimates that Yutu has attained its lowest pressure of 904 hPa (904.0 mbar; 26.70 inHg) after making landfall.

October 25

- 18:00 UTC at 16.5°N 141.5°E – The JTWC assesses Yutu has slightly weakened to a Category 4 super typhoon.

October 26

- 06:00 UTC at 17.0°N 139.1°E – The JTWC re-upgrades Yutu to a Category 5 super typhoon as it starts to re-intensify.
- 18:00 UTC
  - At 17.6°N 136.1°E – The JMA estimates that Yutu has attained a secondary peak with 10-minute winds of 105 knots (194 km/h; 121 mph) and a central pressure of 915 hPa (915.0 mbar; 27.02 inHg) as it turns westward.
  - At 17.5°N 136.2°E – The JTWC assesses that Yutu has re-attained its highest 1-minute winds of 150 knots (280 km/h; 170 mph) as it moves over the Philippine Sea.

October 27

- 00:00 UTC
  - At 17.7°N 134.7°E – The JTWC estimates that Yutu has deepened to its second-lowest pressure of 905 hPa (905.0 mbar; 26.72 inHg).
  - (08:00 PHT) at 17.8°N 134.8°E – Super Typhoon Yutu enters the PAR, prompting the PAGASA to assign it the local name Rosita. The agency assesses the system with 10-minute winds of 105 knots (194 km/h; 121 mph) and a central pressure of 915 hPa (915.0 mbar; 27.02 inHg).
- 18:00 UTC at 17.9°N 131.1°E – The JTWC downgrades Yutu (Rosita) again to a Category 4 super typhoon.

October 28

- 06:00 UTC
  - At 17.6°N 129.1°E – The JTWC estimates that Yutu (Rosita) slightly deepened to a central pressure of 925 hPa (925.0 mbar; 27.32 inHg) as it turns west-southwestward towards Luzon.
  - (14:00 PHT) at 17.9°N 129.1°E – The PAGASA downgrades Yutu (Rosita) to a typhoon.
- 12:00 UTC at 17.7°N 128.1°E – The JTWC assesses Yutu (Rosita) has weakened below super typhoon status.
- 18:00 UTC at 17.4°N 127.1°E – The JTWC further downgrades Yutu (Rosita) to a Category 3-equivalent typhoon on the SSHWS as it turns westward.

Yutu making landfall on Luzon on October 29.

October 29

- 06:00 UTC at 16.8°N 125.2°E – The JMA estimates that Yutu (Rosita) has attained a tertiary peak with 10-minute winds of 80 knots (150 km/h; 92 mph) and a central pressure of 955 hPa (955.0 mbar; 28.20 inHg) as it nears Luzon.
- 12:00 UTC at 16.8°N 124.2°E – The JTWC re-upgrades Yutu (Rosita) to a Category 4 typhoon, achieving a tertiary peak with 1-minute winds of 120 knots (220 km/h; 140 mph) and a central pressure of 938 hPa (938.0 mbar; 27.70 inHg).
- 18:00 UTC at 16.7°N 123.0°E – Typhoon Yutu (Rosita) weakens back to a Category 3 typhoon as it is about to make landfall.
- Between 20:00-21:00 UTC (04:00-05:00 PHT, October 30) at 16.7°N 122.3°E – Typhoon Yutu (Rosita) makes another landfall on Dinapigue, Isabela.

October 30

- 00:00 UTC at 16.8°N 121.6°E – Moving westward inland, Typhoon Yutu (Rosita) weakens to a Category 2-equivalent typhoon on the SSHWS.
- 06:00 UTC
  - At 16.5°N 120.1°E – The JMA downgrades Yutu (Rosita) to a severe tropical storm as it emerges over the South China Sea.
  - At 16.7°N 120.4°E – The JTWC downgrades Yutu (Rosita) to a Category 1-equivalent typhoon on the SSHWS.
  - (14:00 PHT) at 16.6°N 120.1°E – The PAGASA follows suit, downgrading Yutu (Rosita) to a severe tropical storm.
- 18:00 UTC at 16.9°N 118.7°E – Turning northwestward, Yutu (Rosita) weakens further to a tropical storm, per the JTWC.

October 31

- 06:00 UTC
  - At 18.1°N 117.7°E – The JMA downgrades Yutu (Rosita) to a tropical storm as it slowly moves northwestward.
  - (14:00 PHT) at 18.0°N 117.6°E – The PAGASA assesses Yutu (Rosita) has weakened to a tropical storm as it is about to exit the PAR.
- 08:00 UTC (16:00 PHT) – Tropical Storm Yutu (Rosita) exits the PAR.

=== November ===
November 1

- 06:00 UTC at 19.8°N 116.5°E – The JTWC assesses Yutu has attained a fourth peak as a high-end tropical storm with 1-minute winds of 60 knots (110 km/h; 69 mph) and a central pressure of 987 hPa (987.0 mbar; 29.15 inHg) as it turns northward.

November 2

- 06:00 UTC at 20.7°N 116.1°E – The JMA reports Yutu has deteriorated to a tropical depression as it turns to the south-southwest.
- 12:00 UTC at 20.4°N 116.0°E – The JTWC follows suit, downgrading Yutu to a tropical depression over the South China Sea.
- 18:00 UTC at 20.1°N 115.8°E – The JTWC further downgrades Yutu to a tropical disturbance.

November 3

- 00:00 UTC at 19.9°N 115.7°E – The JMA last notes Tropical Depression Yutu as it weakens over the South China Sea; the system fully dissipates six hours later.

November 13

- 00:00 UTC at 9.2°N 156.6°E – The JMA begins tracking a tropical depression north of Pohnpei.
- 06:00 UTC at 8.7°N 155.8°E – The JMA assesses the tropical depression north of Pohnpei attains a central pressure of 1,004 hPa (1,004 mbar; 29.65 inHg).
- 18:00 UTC at 7.9°N 154.0°E – The tropical depression now northwest of Pohnpei re-attains a central pressure of 1,004 hPa (1,004 mbar; 29.65 inHg), per the JMA as the system moves southwestwards.

November 14

- 06:00 UTC at 7.4°N 152.1°E – The JMA assesses that the tropical depression northwest of Pohnpei's central pressure fluctuated to a central pressure of 1,004 hPa (1,004 mbar; 29.65 inHg) as it moves north of Chuuk.
- 18:00 UTC at 8.1°N 150.3°E – The tropical depression now northwest of Chuuk re-attains a central pressure of 1,004 hPa (1,004 mbar; 29.65 inHg), per the JMA.

November 15

- 06:00 UTC at 9.0°N 148.5°E – The tropical depression northwest of Chuuk turns to the west as its central pressure continues to fluctuate, dipping to a central pressure of 1,004 hPa (1,004 mbar; 29.65 inHg), per the JMA.
- 18:00 UTC at 9.0°N 146.7°E – The tropical depression northwest of Chuuk slightly deepened to a central pressure of 1,004 hPa (1,004 mbar; 29.65 inHg), per the JMA as it moves well south of Guam.

November 16

- 06:00 UTC at 8.7°N 144.7°E – The tropical depression well south of Guam turns to the southwest as its central pressure continues to fluctuate, dipping to a central pressure of 1,004 hPa (1,004 mbar; 29.65 inHg), per the JMA.
- 18:00 UTC at 10.0°N 112.5°E – The JMA begins tracking a tropical depression in the South China sea.

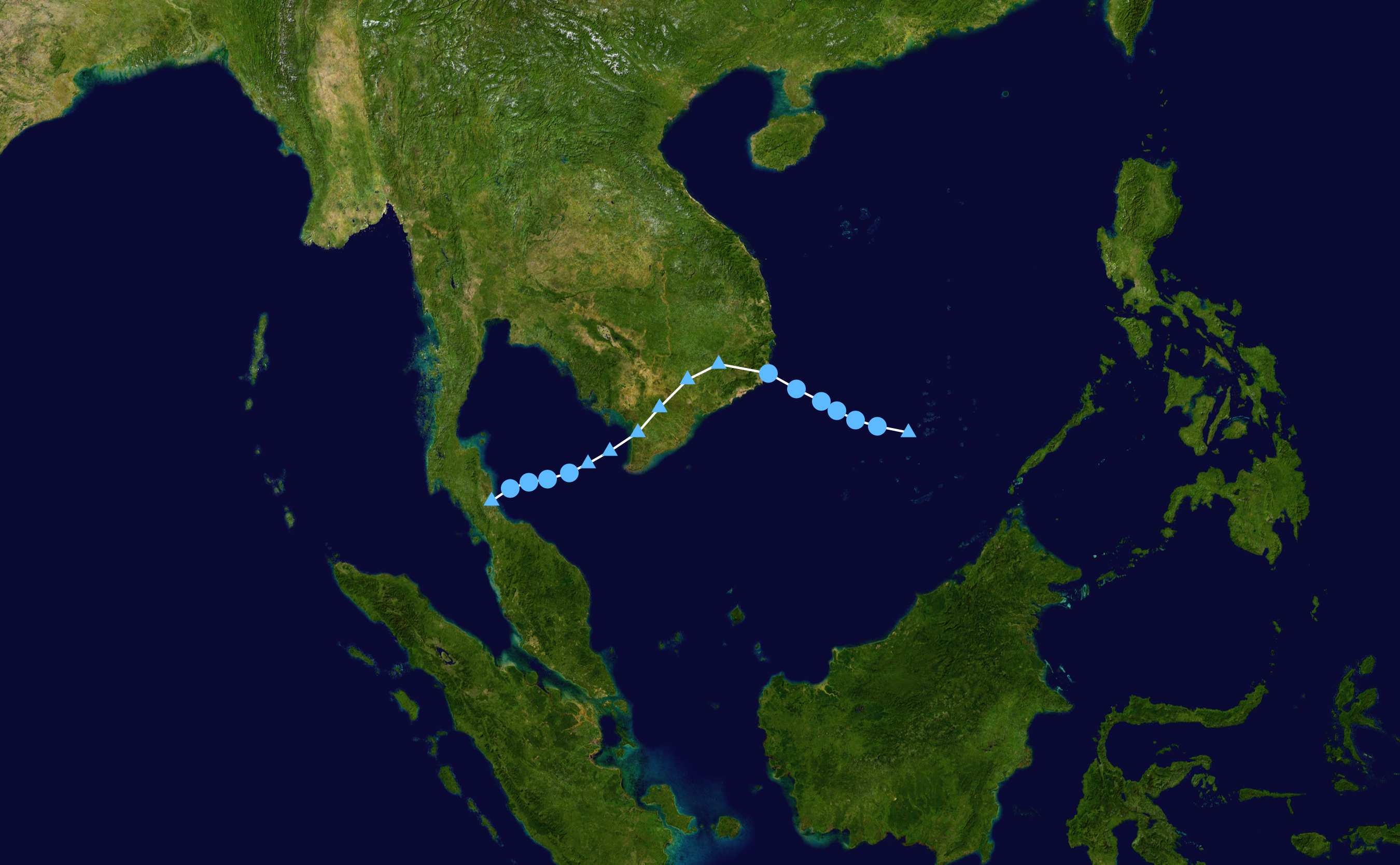
Track of Toraji during mid-late November.

November 17

- 00:00 UTC at 10.0°N 112.7°E – The JTWC begins tracking the South China Sea tropical depression, designating it 32W as it slowly moves northwestwards.
- 06:00 UTC at 10.9°N 111.3°E – The JMA upgrades 32W to a tropical storm, assigning it the name Toraji, subsequently peaking with 10-minute sustained winds of 35 knots (65 km/h; 40 mph) and a central pressure of 1,004 hPa (1,004 mbar; 29.65 inHg).
- 12:00 UTC
  - At 7.1°N 138.5°E – Now southwest of Guam, the JTWC recognizes the tropical depression as a tropical cyclone, designating it 33W with a central pressure of 1,004 hPa (1,004 mbar; 29.65 inHg).
  - At 10.5°N 111.4°E – The JTWC estimates that Toraji has peaked in intensity as a high-end tropical depression with 1-minute sustained winds of 30 knots (56 km/h; 35 mph) and a central pressure of 1,000 hPa (1,000 mbar; 29.53 inHg).

November 18

- 00:00 UTC at 11.6°N 109.5°E – The JMA downgrades Toraji to a tropical depression as it is about to make landfall on Vietnam.
- Between 00:00-06:00 UTC (07:00-13:00 ICT) at 11.7°N 109.2°E – Toraji makes landfall on Vĩnh Hải, Ninh Hải, then-Ninh Thuận province (now Khánh Hòa Province).
- 03:00 UTC (11:00 PHT) – Tropical Depression 33W enters the PAR, prompting the PAGASA to assign it the local name Samuel.
- 06:00 UTC
  - (14:00 PHT) at 6.4°N 134.4°E – The JMA assesses 33W (Samuel) attains a lower central pressure of 1,002 hPa (1,002 mbar; 29.59 inHg) while the PAGASA reports the system has 10-minute winds of 30 knots (56 km/h; 35 mph) and a central pressure of 1,002 hPa (1,002 mbar; 29.59 inHg).
  - At 6.2°N 134.4°E – The JTWC assesses 33W (Samuel) attains high-end tropical depression strength with 1-minute sustained winds of 30 knots (56 km/h; 35 mph) and a central pressure of 1,003 hPa (1,003 mbar; 29.62 inHg) as it turns to the northwest.
- 12:00 UTC
  - At 11.8°N 108.2°E – The JMA last notes Toraji as it dissipates six hours later over Vietnam.
  - At 12.0°N 107.6°E – The JTWC downgrades Toraji to a tropical disturbance as it moves further inland.
- 18:00 UTC
  - At 7.1°N 133.0°E – The JMA assesses 33W (Samuel) has re-attained a central pressure of 1,002 hPa (1,002 mbar; 29.59 inHg).
  - (02:00 PHT, November 19) at 7.2°N 133.0°E – The PAGASA also reports 33W (Samuel) has re-deepened a central pressure of 1,002 hPa (1,002 mbar; 29.59 inHg).

November 19

- 06:00 UTC (14:00 PHT) at 8.7°N 131.2°E – 33W (Samuel)'s central pressure fluctuates, dipping again to 1,002 hPa (1,002 mbar; 29.59 inHg), per the JMA and the PAGASA.
- 18:00 UTC
  - At 9.8°N 129.5°E – The JMA reports 33W (Samuel) has re-attained a central pressure of 1,002 hPa (1,002 mbar; 29.59 inHg) as it continues to move northwestwards.
  - (02:00 PHT, November 19) at 9.8°N 129.4°E – The PAGASA also reports 33W (Samuel) has re-deepened a central pressure of 1,002 hPa (1,002 mbar; 29.59 inHg) as it nears Visayas.

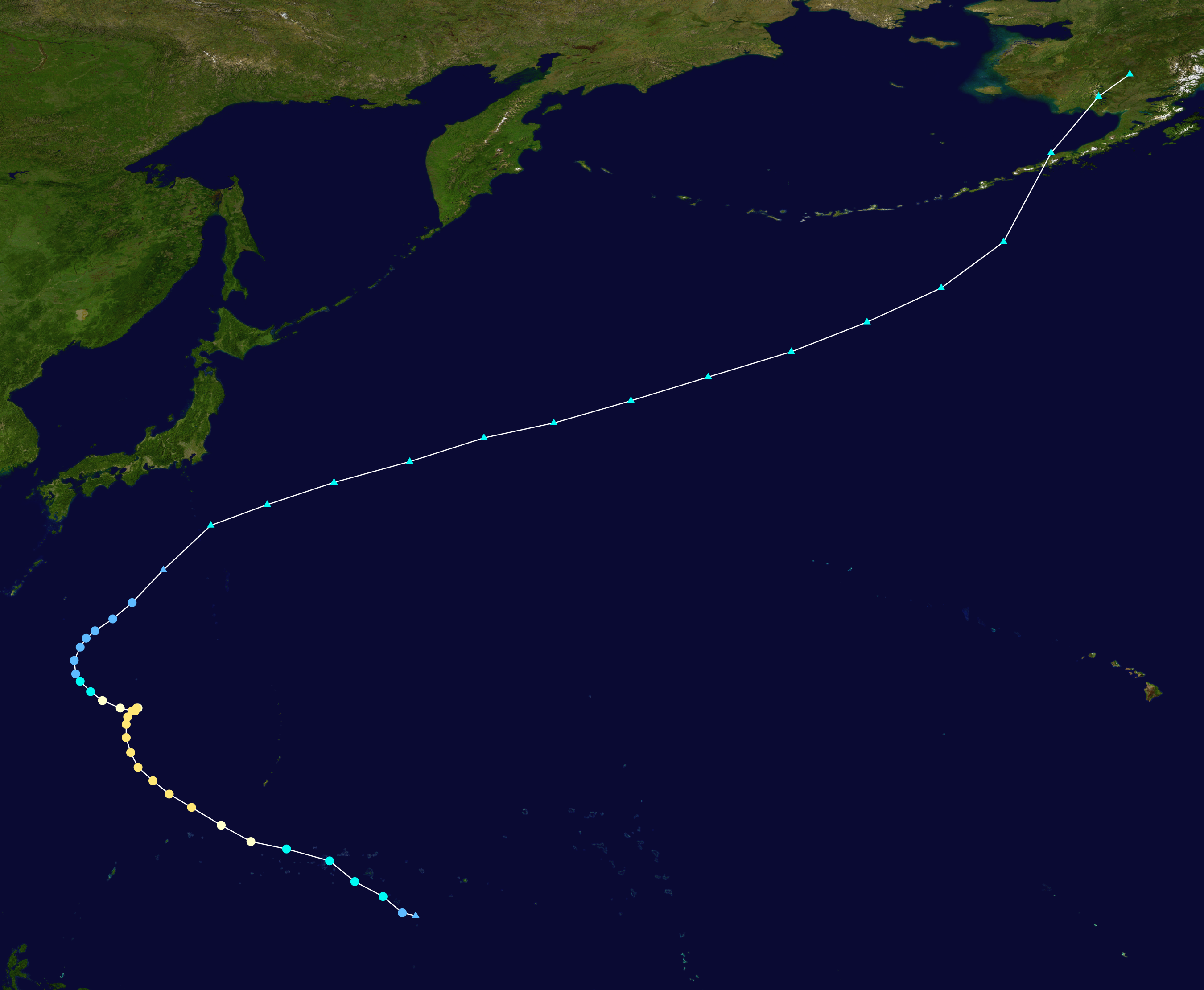
Track of Man-yi during late November.

November 20

- 00:00 UTC at 8.5°N 102.8°E – After its remnants emerged over the Gulf of Thailand, the JTWC re-upgrades Ex-Toraji to a tropical depression.
- 06:00 UTC
  - At 10.6°N 127.7°E – Tropical Depression 33W (Samuel) deepens back to a central pressure of 1,002 hPa (1,002 mbar; 29.59 inHg), per the JMA as it head towards Samar Island.
  - At 10.6°N 127.1°E – The JTWC assesses 33W (Samuel) briefly attained a central pressure of 1,002 hPa (1,002 mbar; 29.59 inHg).
  - (14:00 PHT) at 10.4°N 127.7°E – The PAGASA also reports 33W (Samuel)'s central pressure fluctuated back to 1,002 hPa (1,002 mbar; 29.59 inHg).
  - At 8.3°N 102.1°E – The JTWC assesses Ex-Toraji has re-attained its peak with 1-minute sustained winds of 30 knots (56 km/h; 35 mph) and a central pressure of 1,000 hPa (1,000 mbar; 29.53 inHg) as it moves southwestwards.
- 12:00 UTC
  - At 5.0°N 152.6°E – The JMA begins tracking a tropical depression near Chuuk State.
  - At 4.7°N 154.0°E – The JTWC begins tracking the Chuuk State tropical depression, designating it 34W.
- 17:00 UTC (01:00 PHT, November 21) at 11.3°N 125.6°E – Tropical Depression 33W (Samuel) makes its first landfall on Hernani, Eastern Samar.
- 18:00 UTC
  - At 5.8°N 152.2°E – The JMA upgrades 34W to a tropical storm, assigning it the name Man-yi.
  - At 5.8°N 152.7°E – The JTWC upgrades Man-yi to a tropical storm as the system moves northwestwards.
  - At 11.4°N 125.2°E – The JTWC downgrades 33W (Samuel) to a tropical disturbance after making landfall.
- Between 21:00-00:00 UTC, November 21 (04:00-07:00 ICT, November 21) – Tropical Depression Ex-Toraji makes landfall on Songhla province at the Malay Peninsula.
- 22:00 UTC (06:00 PHT, November 21) at 11.3°N 124.0°E – After crossing Eastern Visayas and emerging over the Camotes Sea, Tropical Depression Samuel makes another landfall on Daanbantayan, Cebu.
- 23:00 UTC (07:00 PHT, November 21) at 11.2°N 123.7°E – After briefly crossing Tañon Strait, Tropical Depression Samuel makes its third landfall on Bantayan, Cebu.

November 21

- 00:00 UTC
  - (08:00 PHT) at 11.0°N 123.4°E – Tropical Depression Samuel makes another hit on Cadiz City, Negros Occidental.
  - At 7.6°N 100.3°E – The JTWC last notes Ex-Toraji, downgrading it to a tropical disturbance after making landfall over the Malay Peninsula.
- 02:00 UTC (10:00 PHT) at 10.8°N 122.7°E – Tropical Depression Samuel makes its fifth hit on Dumangas, Iloilo after briefly crossing Guimaras Strait.
- 06:00 UTC at 10.7°N 121.6°E – The JMA reports Samuel has slightly deepened once again to a central pressure of 1,004 hPa (1,004 mbar; 29.65 inHg) after emerging over the Sulu Sea.
- 12:00 UTC at 10.7°N 120.7°E – The JTWC reports Samuel has re-intensified to a tropical depression as it is about to hit Palawan.
- 13:00 UTC (21:00 PHT) at 10.7°N 120.7°E – Tropical Depression 33W (Samuel) makes its sixth landfall on Araceli, Palawan.
- 18:00 UTC at 9.5°N 143.8°E – The JTWC upgrades Man-yi to a Category 1 typhoon as it passes south of Guam.

Track of Usagi during late November.

November 22

- 00:00 UTC
  - At 11.3°N 117.0°E – After days of becoming a tropical depression, 33W (Samuel) intensifies to a tropical storm, with the JMA assigning it the name Usagi as it now moves over the South China Sea.
  - (08:00 PHT) at 11.2°N 117.3°E – The JTWC and PAGASA follow suit, upgrading Usagi (Samuel) to a tropical storm. The latter assesses the system has reached its peak inside the PAR with 10-minute winds of 35 knots (65 km/h; 40 mph) and a central pressure of 1,000 hPa (1,000 mbar; 29.53 inHg).
  - At 10.4°N 141.7°E – The JMA assesses Man-yi has strengthened to a severe tropical storm.
- 06:00 UTC at 11.8°N 139.8°E – The JTWC further upgrades Man-yi to a Category 2 typhoon on the SSHWS.
- 10:00 UTC (18:00 PHT) – Tropical Storm Usagi (Samuel) leaves the PAR.
- 12:00 UTC at 12.9°N 138.2°E – The JMA reports Man-yi has intensified to a typhoon.
- 18:00 UTC at 13.6°N 137.2°E – The JTWC estimates that Man-yi has peaked as a high-end Category 2 typhoon with 1-minute sustained winds of 95 knots (176 km/h; 109 mph) with a central pressure of 967 hPa (967.0 mbar; 28.56 inHg) as it turns to the north-northwest.

November 23

- 06:00 UTC
  - At 10.6°N 111.6°E – The JMA upgrades Usagi to a severe tropical storm as it moves west-southwestward.
  - At 15.5°N 135.7°E – The JTWC estimates that Man-yi slightly deepened to a central pressure of 970 hPa (970.0 mbar; 28.64 inHg) as it maintained its Category 2 intensity while turning north.
- 12:00 UTC at 10.2°N 110.9°E – The JTWC upgrades Usagi to a Category 1 typhoon as it nears Vietnam.

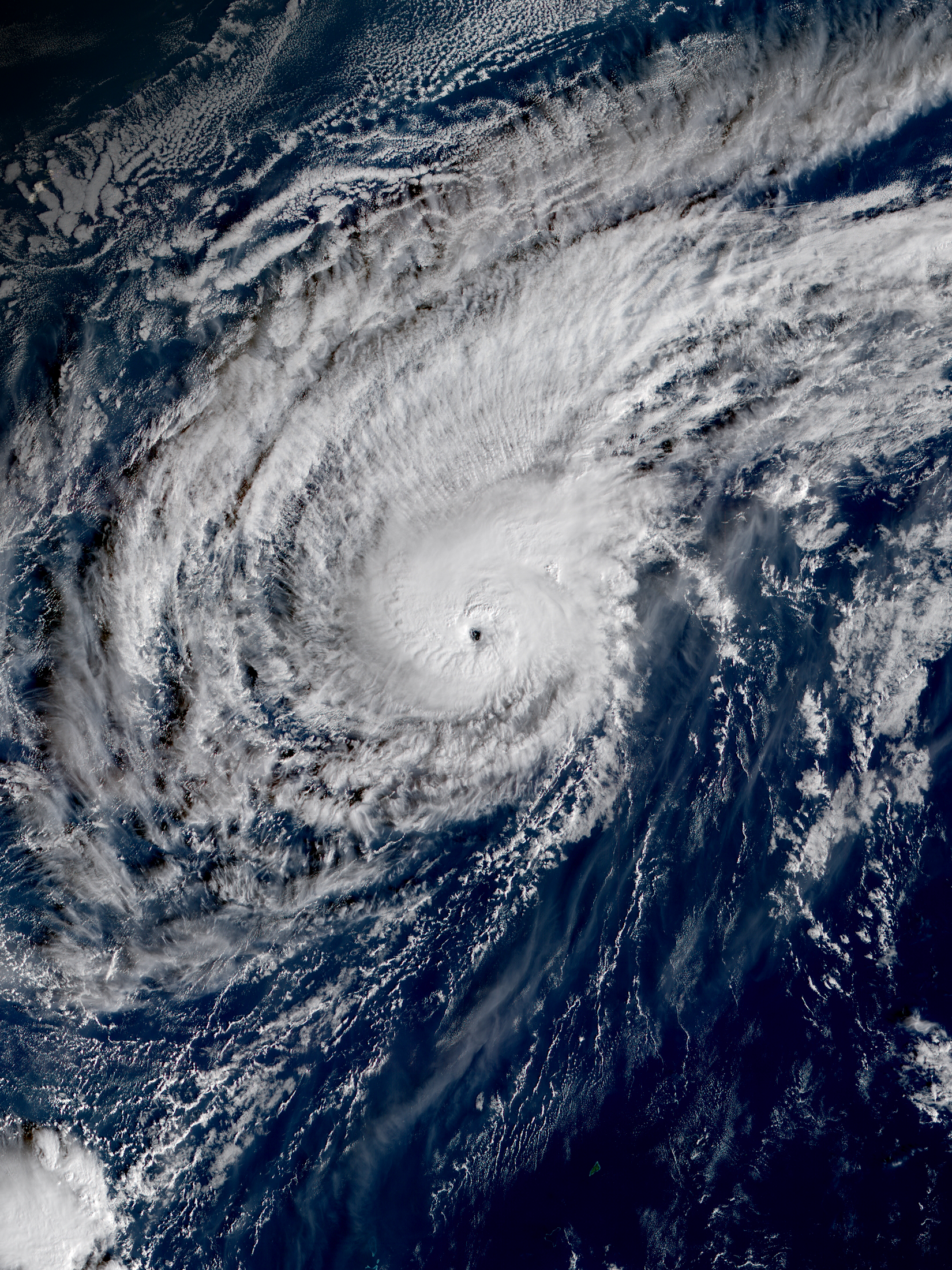
Man-yi stalling over the Philippine Sea near its peak on November 24.

November 24

- 00:00 UTC
  - At 9.7°N 109.5°E – The JMA estimates that Usagi has peaked in intensity with 10-minute sustained winds of 60 knots (110 km/h; 69 mph) and a central pressure of 990 hPa (990.0 mbar; 29.23 inHg) as it moves south of Phú Quý Island.
  - At 9.6°N 109.5°E – The JTWC further upgrades Usagi to a Category 2 typhoon, subsequently peaking with 1-minute sustained winds of 90 knots (170 km/h; 100 mph) and a central pressure of 971 hPa (971.0 mbar; 28.67 inHg) as it slows down.
  - At 17.9°N 135.5°E – The JTWC estimates that Man-yi further deepened, reaching its lowest central pressure of 959 hPa (959.0 mbar; 28.32 inHg) as it slowly moves to the northeast.
- 06:00 UTC at 18.3°N 135.9°E – The JTWC assesses Man-yi has weakened to a Category 1 typhoon.
- 12:00 UTC
  - At 18.7°N 136.2°E – The JMA estimates that Man-yi has peaked in intensity with 10-minute winds of 80 knots (150 km/h; 92 mph) and a central pressure of 960 hPa (960.0 mbar; 28.35 inHg) as it loops back to the southwest.
  - At 9.8°N 108.3°E – The JTWC downgrades Usagi to a Category 1-equivalent typhoon on the SSHWS as it slowly moves westward.
- 18:00 UTC at 18.5°N 136.1°E – The JTWC re-upgrades Man-yi to a Category 2 typhoon.

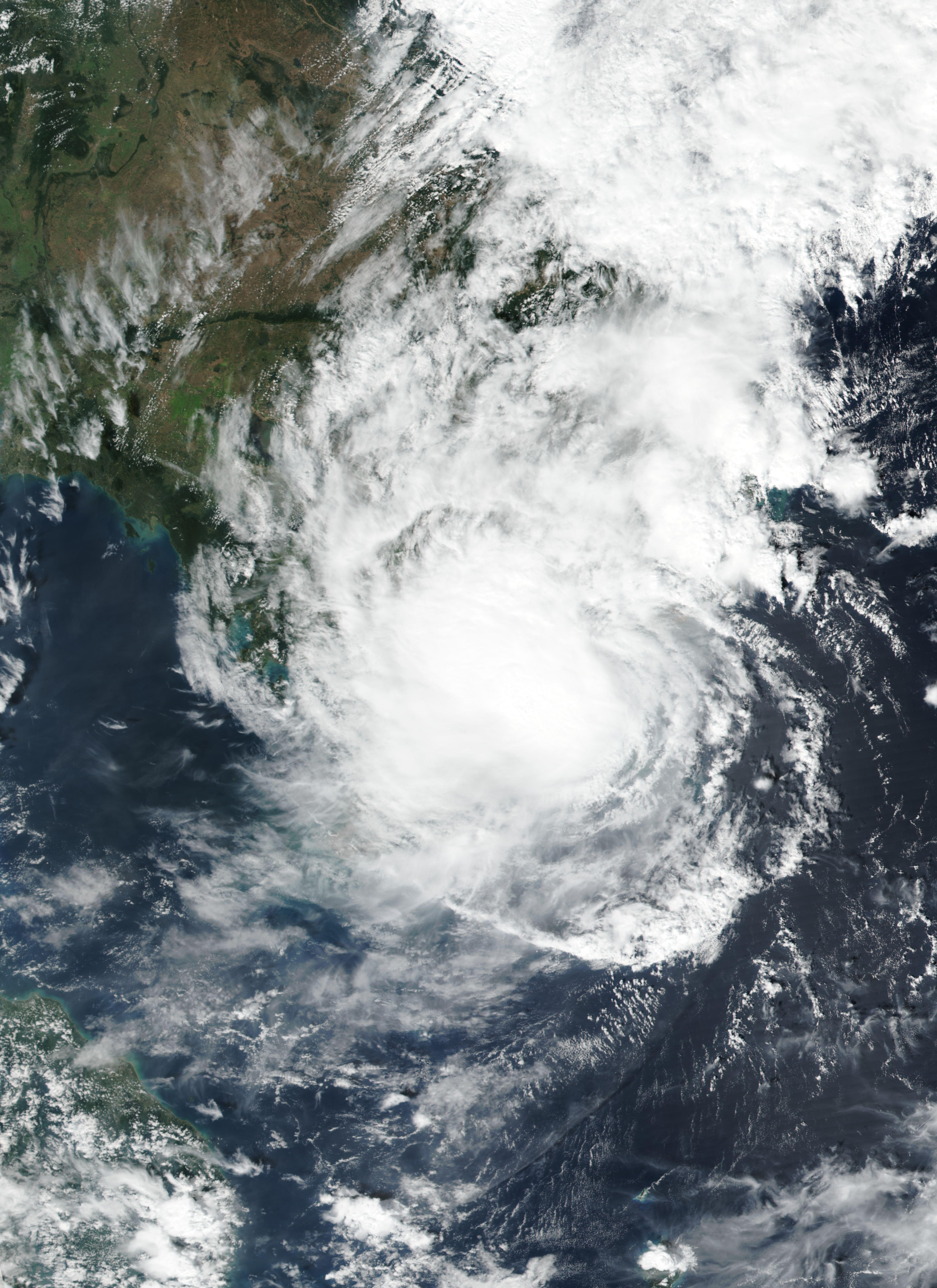
Usagi making landfall over Vietnam on November 25.

November 25

- 00:00 UTC
  - At 9.9°N 107.4°E – The JMA downgrades Usagi to a severe tropical storm as it steers to the north-northwest.
  - At 10.0°N 107.8°E – The JTWC downgrades Usagi to a tropical storm as it is about to make landfall on Vietnam.
  - At 18.3°N 136.0°E – The JTWC estimates that Man-yi has re-attained its peak 1-minute sustained winds of 95 knots (176 km/h; 109 mph) with its second-lowest central pressure of 963 hPa (963.0 mbar; 28.44 inHg) as it turns to the west.
- 07:00 UTC (14:00 ICT) at 10.4°N 107.1°E – Tropical Storm Usagi makes its seventh and final landfall on Vũng Tàu of then-Bà Rịa–Vũng Tàu province.
- 12:00 UTC
  - At 18.5°N 135.0°E – The JTWC downgrades Man-yi to a Category 1-equivalent typhoon for the final time.
  - (20:00 PHT) at 18.4°N 135.0°E – After meandering for a few days near the PAR border, Man-yi finally enters the PAR, prompting the PAGASA to assign it the local name Tomas. Upon entering, the agency assesses the system as a severe tropical storm with 10-minute winds of 60 knots (110 km/h; 69 mph) and a central pressure of 980 hPa (980.0 mbar; 28.94 inHg).
- 18:00 UTC
  - At 19.1°N 134.0°E – The JMA downgrades Man-yi (Tomas) to a severe tropical storm as it turns to the northwest.
  - At 10.7°N 106.9°E – The JTWC downgrades Usagi to a tropical depression as it moves further inland.

November 26

- 00:00 UTC
  - At 11.4°N 105.9°E – The JMA downgrades Usagi to a tropical depression as it moves westward, moving onto Cambodia.
  - At 19.7°N 133.0°E – The JMA further downgrades Man-yi (Tomas) to a tropical storm.
  - (08:00 PHT) at 19.6°N 133.0°E – The JTWC and PAGASA follow suit, downgrading Man-yi (Tomas) to a tropical storm.
- 06:00 UTC at 11.3°N 105.8°E – The JTWC assesses Usagi has managed to slightly deepen to 1,004 hPa (1,004 mbar; 29.65 inHg) as it further weakens.
- 12:00 UTC
  - At 11.5°N 105.3°E – The JTWC downgrades Usagi to a tropical disturbance.
  - (20:00 PHT) at 21.0°N 132.0°E – The JMA and PAGASA downgrades Man-yi (Tomas) to a tropical depression as it starts to recurve for the second time.
  - At 20.8°N 132.0°E – The JTWC downgrades Man-yi (Tomas) to a tropical depression as it continues to weaken.
- 18:00 UTC at 12.0°N 104.0°E – The JMA last notes Usagi as it moves over Cambodia; the system dissipated six hours later.

November 27

- 00:00 UTC at 22.7°N 132.3°E – The JMA briefly re-upgrades Man-yi (Tomas) to a tropical storm with 10-minute winds of 35 knots (65 km/h; 40 mph) and a central pressure of 1,006 hPa (1,006 mbar; 29.71 inHg).
- 06:00 UTC at 23.5°N 132.4°E – The JMA downgrades Man-yi (Tomas) to a tropical depression as it gradually accelerates to the northeast.
- 18:00 UTC
  - At 24.5°N 134.5°E – The JTWC assesses that Man-yi (Tomas) has transitioned into an extratropical cyclone.
  - (02:00 PHT, November 28) at 24.3°N 134.5°E – The PAGASA assesses Man-yi (Tomas) has turned extratropical.

November 28

- 06:00 UTC at 27.8°N 137.9°E – The JMA assesses that Man-yi has transitioned into an extratropical cyclone as it speeds off to the northeast.

November 30

- 12:00 UTC at 42.5°N 179.8°W – The JMA last notes the extratropical remnants of Man-yi as it crosses the International Date Line.

=== December ===
December 25

- 06:00 UTC at 8.3°N 135.3°E – The JMA begins tracking a tropical depression in the Philippine Sea, northeast of Palau with a central pressure of 1,002 hPa (1,002 mbar; 29.59 inHg).
- 10:00 UTC (18:00 PHT) – The Philippine Sea tropical depression enters the PAR, prompting the PAGASA to assign it the local name Usman.
- 12:00 UTC at 8.9°N 134.7°E – The JMA assesses Usman attained 10-minute winds of 30 knots (56 km/h; 35 mph) as it moves northwestward.

December 26

- 06:00 UTC at 10.3°N 132.2°E – The JMA reports Usman has also attained its lowest central pressure of 1,000 hPa (1,000 mbar; 29.53 inHg).

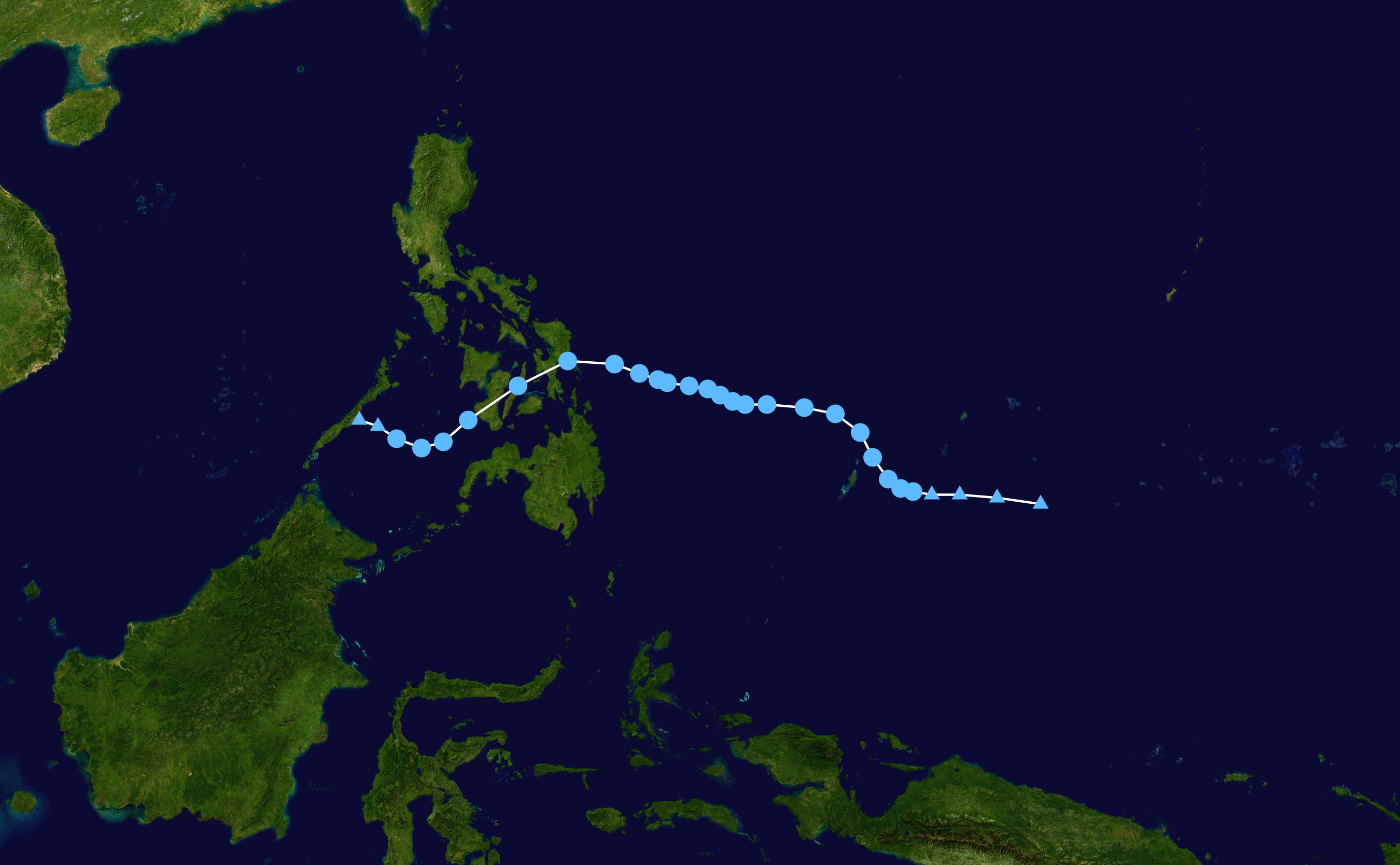
Track of 35W (Usman) during late December.

December 27

- 00:00 UTC at 9.9°N 130.9°E – The JTWC begins tracking Usman, designating it 35W.
- 06:00 UTC at 10.6°N 128.8°E – The JMA assesses 35W (Usman) has re-attained its lowest central pressure of 1,000 hPa (1,000 mbar; 29.53 inHg).
- 12:00 UTC (20:00 PHT) at 10.5°N 129.5°E – The PAGASA assesses 35W (Usman) has attained its maximum 10-minute sustained winds of 30 knots (56 km/h; 35 mph) as it slowly moves westward.
- 18:00 UTC at 10.7°N 128.4°E – Tropical Depression 35W (Usman)'s central pressure slightly drops to 1,000 hPa (1,000 mbar; 29.53 inHg) once again, per the JMA.

December 28

- 00:00 UTC
  - At 10.7°N 128.8°E – The JTWC assesses 35W (Usman) has attained its peak 1-minute sustained winds of 30 knots (56 km/h; 35 mph).
  - (08:00 PHT) at 10.6°N 128.7°E – The PAGASA assesses 35W (Usman) has also attained its lowest central pressure at 998 hPa (998.0 mbar; 29.47 inHg).
- 06:00 UTC at 10.8°N 128.5°E – The JTWC reports 35W (Usman) has deepened to a central pressure of 998 hPa (998.0 mbar; 29.47 inHg).
- 12:00 UTC at 11.0°N 127.7°E – The JTWC downgrades 35W (Usman) to a low-pressure area as it approaches Visayas.
- 21:00 UTC (05:00 PHT, December 29) at 11.6°N 125.4°E – Tropical Depression Usman makes landfall on Borongan City, Eastern Samar.

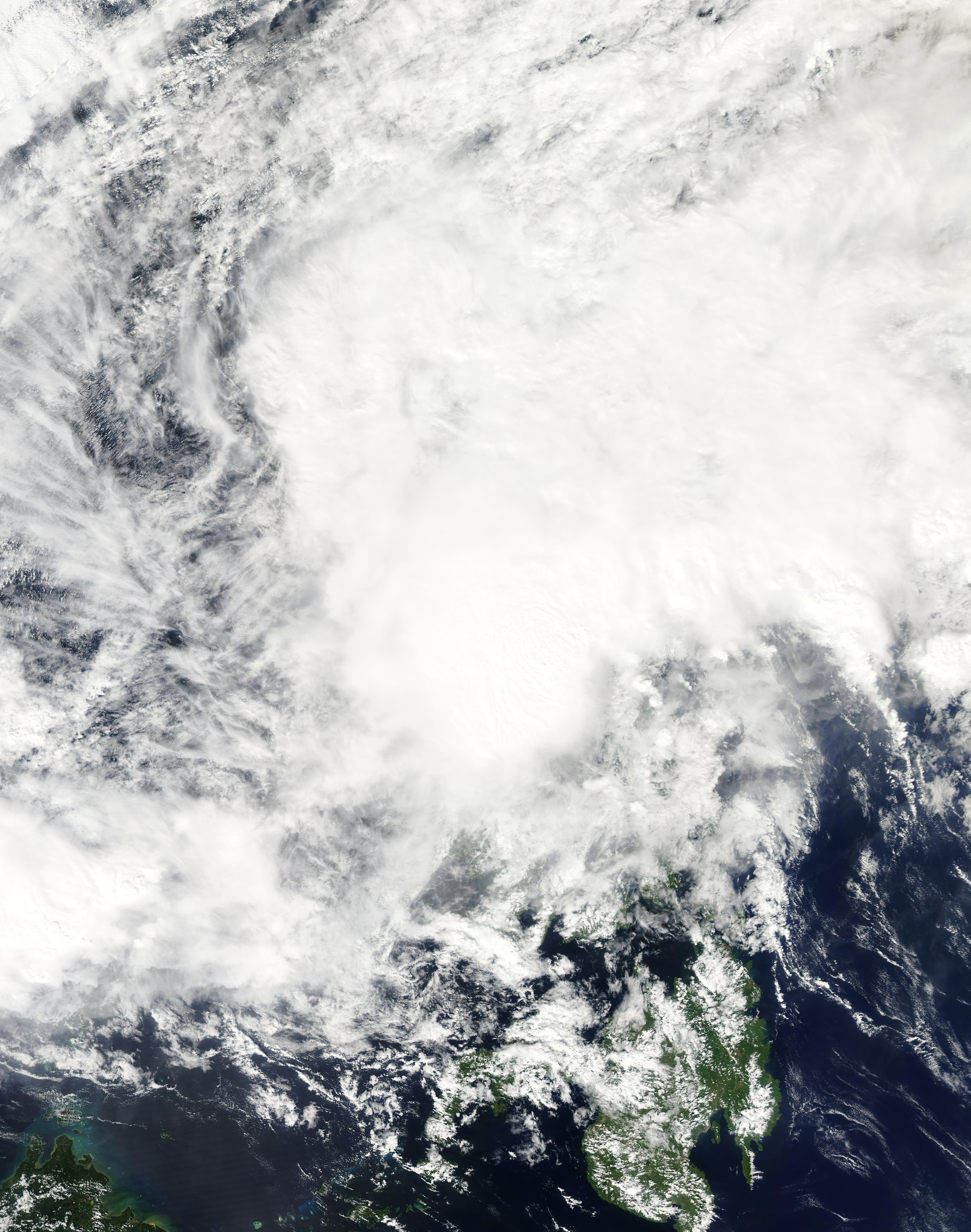
35W (Usman) over the Philippines on December 29.

December 29

- 01:00 UTC (09:00 PHT) at 11.6°N 124.6°E – After crossing Samar Island and emerging over the Samar Sea, Tropical Depression Usman makes another landfall on the border of Caibiran and Culaba towns in Biliran.
- 06:00 UTC at 11.3°N 123.3°E – The JMA assesses Usman slightly deepened to a central pressure of 1,004 hPa (1,004 mbar; 29.65 inHg) as it traverses the Visayan Sea.
- 12:00 UTC (20:00 PHT) at 10.8°N 122.8°E – Turning southwestward and moving along the Guimaras Strait, Usman makes its third landfall on Guimaras province.
- 15:00 UTC at 8.4°N 121.0°E – The JMA last notes Usman as it further weakens over the Sulu Sea and dissipates.
- 18:00 UTC (02:00 PHT, December 30) at 8.8°N 120.8°E – Turning generally westward, the PAGASA assesses Usman slightly deepened to a central pressure of 1,006 hPa (1,006 mbar; 29.71 inHg).

December 30

- 06:00 UTC (14:00 PHT) at 8.9°N 118.8°E – The PAGASA assesses Usman has re-attained a central pressure of 1,006 hPa (1,006 mbar; 29.71 inHg) as it nears Palawan.
- 12:00 UTC (20:00 PHT) at 8.8°N 117.7°E – Usman makes its final landfall on Brooke's Point, Palawan and subsequently weakens to a remnant low, per the PAGASA.,

December 31

- 06:00 UTC at 7.6°N 111.9°E – The JMA begins tracking a tropical depression in the South China Sea.
- 06:00 UTC at 8.0°N 112.1°E – The JTWC designates the tropical depression over the South China Sea as 36W; the system becomes Tropical Storm Pabuk in the opening days of the 2019 Pacific typhoon season.
- 23:59 UTC – The 2018 Pacific typhoon season officially ends.
